Rodents are animals that gnaw with two continuously growing incisors. Forty percent of mammal species are rodents, and they inhabit every continent except Antarctica.

This list contains 2,276 species in 489 genera in the order Rodentia.

Suborder Hystricomorpha

Family Ctenodactylidae
Genus Ctenodactylus
Ctenodactylus gundi - North African gundi
Ctenodactylus vali - Val's gundi
Genus Felovia
Felovia vae - Felou gundi
Genus Massoutiera
Massoutiera mzabi - Mazab gundi
Genus Pectinator
Pectinator spekei - Speke's pectinator

Family Diatomyidae
Genus Laonastes
Laonastes aenigmamus - Laotian rock rat

Family Bathyergidae
Genus Bathyergus
Bathyergus janetta - Namaqua dune mole rat
Bathyergus suillus - Cape dune mole rat
Genus Cryptomys
Cryptomys hottentotus - African mole rat
Cryptomys mahali - Mahali mole-rat
Cryptomys nimrodi - Matabeleland mole-rat
Genus Fukomys
Fukomys amatus - Zambian mole-rat 
Fukomys anselli - Ansell's mole-rat 
Fukomys bocagei - Bocage's mole-rat
Fukomys damarensis - Damaraland mole-rat 
Fukomys darlingi - Mashona mole-rat 
Fukomys foxi - Nigerian mole-rat 
Fukomys ilariae - Somali striped mole rat
Fukomys hanangensis - Hanang mole-rat
Fukomys kafuensis - Kafue mole-rat 
Fukomys livingstoni - Livingstone's mole-rat
Fukomys mechowii - Mechow's mole-rat
Fukomys micklemi - Micklem's mole-rat
Fukomys occlusus
Fukomys ochraceocinereus - Ochre mole-rat
Fukomys vandewoestijneae - Caroline's mole rat 
Fukomys whytei - Whyte's mole-rat
Fukomys zechi - Ghana mole-rat
Genus Georychus
Georychus capensis - Cape mole rat
Genus Heliophobius
Heliophobius argenteocinereus - silvery mole rat

Family Heterocephalidae
Genus Heterocephalus
Heterocephalus glaber - naked mole-rat

Family Hystricidae
Genus Atherurus
Atherurus africanus - African brush-tailed porcupine
Atherurus macrourus - Asiatic brush-tailed porcupine 
Genus Hystrix
Subgenus Acanthion
Hystrix brachyura - Malayan porcupine
Hystrix javanica - Sunda porcupine 
Subgenus Hystrix
Hystrix africaeaustralis - Cape porcupine
Hystrix cristata - Crested porcupine
Hystrix indica - Indian porcupine 
Subgenus Thecurus
Hystrix crassispinis - Thick-spined porcupine
Hystrix pumila - Philippine porcupine  
Hystrix sumatrae - Sumatran porcupine
Genus Trichys
Trichys fasciculata - Long-tailed porcupine

Family Petromuridae
Genus Petromus
Petromus antiquus (extinct)
Petromus minor (extinct)
Petromus typicus - Dassie rat

Family Thryonomyidae
Genus Thryonomys
Thryonomys asakomae (extinct)
Thryonomys gregorianus - Lesser cane rat
Thryonomys swinderianus - Greater cane rat

Family Erethizontidae

Subfamily Chaetomyinae
Genus Chaetomys
Chaetomys subspinosus - Bristle-spined rat

Subfamily Erethizontinae
Genus Coendou
Coendou baturitensis - Baturite porcupine 
Coendou bicolor - Bicolored-spined porcupine 
Coendou ichillus - Streaked dwarf porcupine 
Coendou insidiosus - Bahia porcupine
Coendou longicaudatus - Amazonian long-tailed porcupine
Coendou melanurus - Black-tailed hairy dwarf porcupine 
Coendou mexicanus - Mexican hairy dwarf porcupine 
Coendou nycthemera - Black dwarf porcupine 
Coendou prehensilis - Brazilian porcupine 
Coendou pruinosus - Frosted hairy dwarf porcupine 
Coendou quichua - Andean porcupine
Coendou roosmalenorum - Roosmalen's dwarf porcupine 
Coendou rothschildi? - Rothschild's porcupine 
Coendou rufescens - Stump-tailed porcupine 
Coendou sanctamartae - Santa Marta porcupine 
Coendou speratus - Pernambuco dwarf porcupine
Coendou spinosus - Paraguaian hairy dwarf porcupine 
Coendou vestitus - Brown hairy dwarf porcupine 
Genus Erethizon
Erethizon bathygnathum (extinct)
Erethizon cascoensis (extinct)
Erethizon dorsatum - North American porcupine
Erethizon kleini (extinct)
Erethizon poyeri (extinct)

Family Chinchillidae
Genus Chinchilla
Chinchilla chinchilla - Short-tailed chinchilla
Chinchilla lanigera - Long-tailed chinchilla 
Genus Lagidium
Lagidium ahuacaense - Ecuadorean mountain viscacha
Lagidium peruanum - Northern viscacha 
Lagidium viscacia - Southern viscacha 
Lagidium wolffsohni - Wolffsohn's viscacha
Genus Lagostomus
Lagostomus crassus?  (extinct)
Lagostomus maximus - Plains viscacha
Lagostomus telenkechanum (extinct)

Family Dinomyidae
Genus Dinomys
Dinomys branickii - Pacarana

Family Caviidae

Subfamily Caviinae
Genus Cavia
Cavia anolaimae?
Cavia aperea - Brazilian guinea pig 
Cavia fulgida - Shiny guinea pig 
Cavia guianae?
Cavia intermedia - Santa Catarina's guinea pig 
Cavia magna - Greater guinea pig 
Cavia patzelti? - Sacha guinea pig
Cavia porcellus - Domestic guinea pig 
Cavia tschudii - Montane guinea pig 
Genus Galea
Galea comes - Southern highland yellow-toothed cavy
Galea flavidens - Brandt's yellow-toothed cavy
Galea leucoblephara - Lowland yellow-toothed cavy
Galea monasteriensis? - Muenster yellow-toothed cavy  
Galea musteloides - Common yellow-toothed cavy 
Galea spixii - Spix's yellow-toothed cavy 
Genus Microcavia
Microcavia australis - Southern mountain cavy
Microcavia jayat - Jayat's mountain cavy
Microcavia maenas - Thomas's mountain cavy 
Microcavia niata - Andean mountain cavy 
Microcavia shiptoni - Shipton's mountain cavy
Microcavia sorojchi - Sorojchi mountain cavy

Subfamily Dolichotinae
Genus Dolichotis
Dolichotis patagonum - Patagonian mara 
Genus Pediolagus
Pediolagus salinicola - Chacoan mara

Subfamily Hydrochoerinae 
Genus Hydrochoerus
Hydrochoerus ballesterensis (extinct)
Hydrochoerus gaylordi (extinct)
Hydrochoerus hesperotiganites (extinct)
Hydrochoerus hydrochaeris - Capybara 
Hydrochoerus isthmius - Lesser capybara 
Genus Kerodon
Kerodon acrobata - Acrobatic cavy 
Kerodon rupestris - Rock cavy

Family Dasyproctidae
Genus Dasyprocta
Dasyprocta azarae - Azara's agouti 
Dasyprocta coibae - Coiban agouti 
Dasyprocta cristata - Crested agouti 
Dasyprocta fuliginosa - Black agouti 
Dasyprocta guamara - Orinoco agouti 
Dasyprocta kalinowskii - Kalinowski agouti 
Dasyprocta leporina - Red-rumped agouti 
Dasyprocta mexicana - Mexican agouti 
Dasyprocta prymnolopha - Black-rumped agouti 
Dasyprocta punctata - Central American agouti 
Dasyprocta ruatanica - Ruatan Island agouti 
Genus Myoprocta
Myoprocta acouchy - Red acouchi
Myoprocta pratti - Green acouchi

Family Cuniculidae

Genus Cuniculus
Cuniculus hernandezi?
Cuniculus paca - Lowland paca 
Cuniculus taczanowskii - Mountain paca

Family Ctenomyidae

Genus Ctenomys
Ctenomys andersoni - Anderson's cujuchi
Ctenomys argentinus - Argentine tuco-tuco 
Ctenomys australis - Southern tuco-tuco 
Ctenomys azarae? - Azara's tuco-tuco 
Ctenomys bergi - Berg's tuco-tuco
Ctenomys bidaui - Bidau's tuco-tuco
Ctenomys boliviensis - Bolivian tuco-tuco 
Ctenomys bonettoi - Bonetto's tuco-tuco 
Ctenomys brasiliensis - Brazilian tuco-tuco 
Ctenomys budini? - Budin's tuco-tuco 
Ctenomys colburni - Colburn's tuco-tuco 
Ctenomys coludo - Puntilla tuco-tuco
Ctenomys conoveri - Conover's tuco-tuco 
Ctenomys contrerasi - Contreras's tuco-tuco
Ctenomys coyhaiquensis - Coyhaique tuco-tuco
Ctenomys dorbignyi - D'Orbigny's tuco-tuco
Ctenomys dorsalis - Chacoan tuco-tuco 
Ctenomys erikacuellarae - Erika's tuco-tuco
Ctenomys emilianus - Emily's tuco-tuco
Ctenomys famosus - Famatina tuco-tuco
Ctenomys flamarioni - Flamarion's tuco-tuco
Ctenomys fochi - Foch's tuco-tuco
Ctenomys fodax - Lago Blanco tuco-tuco
Ctenomys frater - Reddish tuco-tuco 
Ctenomys fulvus - Tawny tuco-tuco 
Ctenomys goodfellowi - Goodfellow's tuco-tuco
Ctenomys haigi - Haig's tuco-tuco 
Ctenomys ibicuiensis - Ibicui tuco-tuco
Ctenomys johannis - San Juan tuco-tuco
Ctenomys juris - Jujuy tuco-tuco
Ctenomys knighti - Catamarca tuco-tuco 
Ctenomys lami - Lami tuco-tuco
Ctenomys latro - Mottled tuco-tuco 
Ctenomys lessai - Lessa's tuco-tuco
Ctenomys leucodon - White-toothed tuco-tuco 
Ctenomys lewisi - Lewis' tuco-tuco 
Ctenomys magellanicus - Magellanic tuco-tuco 
Ctenomys maulinus - Maule tuco-tuco 
Ctenomys mendocinus - Mendoza tuco-tuco 
Ctenomys minutus - Tiny tuco-tuco 
Ctenomys nattereri - Natterer's tuco-tuco 
Ctenomys occultus - Furtive tuco-tuco 
Ctenomys opimus - Highland tuco-tuco 
Ctenomys osvaldoreigi - Reig's tuco-tuco
Ctenomys pearsoni - Pearson's tuco-tuco 
Ctenomys perrensi - Goya tuco-tuco 
Ctenomys peruanus - Peruvian tuco-tuco
Ctenomys pilarensis - Pilar tuco-tuco
Ctenomys pontifex - San Luis tuco-tuco 
Ctenomys porteousi? - Porteous' tuco-tuco
Ctenomys pundti - Pundt's tuco-tuco 
Ctenomys rionegrensis - Rio Negro tuco-tuco
Ctenomys roigi - Roig's tuco-tuco 
Ctenomys saltarius - Salta tuco-tuco
Ctenomys scagliai - Scaglia's tuco-tuco 
Ctenomys sericeus - Silky tuco-tuco 
Ctenomys sociabilis - Social tuco-tuco 
Ctenomys steinbachi - Steinbach's tuco-tuco
Ctenomys sylvanus - Forest tuco-tuco 
Ctenomys talarum - Talas tuco-tuco 
Ctenomys thalesi - Thales's tuco-tuco
Ctenomys torquatus - Collared tuco-tuco 
Ctenomys tuconax - Robust tuco-tuco 
Ctenomys tucumanus - Tucuman tuco-tuco
Ctenomys tulduco - Sierra Tontal tuco-tuco 
Ctenomys validus - Strong tuco-tuco
Ctenomys viarapaensis (extinct)
Ctenomys viperinus - Vipos tuco-tuco
Ctenomys yatesi - Yates's tuco-tuco
Ctenomys yolandae - Yolanda's tuco-tuco

Family Octodontidae

Genus Aconaemys
Aconaemys fuscus - Chilean rock rat 
Aconaemys porteri - Porter's rock rat 
Aconaemys sagei - Sage's rock rat 
Genus Octodon
Octodon bridgesi - Bridge's degu 
Octodon degus - Common degu 
Octodon lunatus - Moon-toothed degu 
Octodon pacificus - Isla Mocha degu 
Octodon ricardojeda - Ricardo Ojeda's degu
Genus Octodontomys
Octodontomys gliroides - Mountain degu 
Genus Octomys
Octomys mimax - Mountain viscacha-rat 
Genus Pipanacoctomys
Pipanacoctomys aureus - Golden viscacha-rat 
Genus Spalacopus
Spalacopus cyanus - Coruro 
Genus Tympanoctomys
Tympanoctomys barrerae - Plains viscacha-rat
Tympanoctomys cordubensis (extinct)
Tympanoctomys kirchnerorum - Kirchner's viscacha rat 
Tympanoctomys loschalchalerosorum - Los Chalchaleros' viscacha-rat

Family Abrocomidae
Genus Abrocoma
Abrocoma bennettii - Bennett's chinchilla rat 
Abrocoma boliviensis - Bolivian chinchilla rat 
Abrocoma budini - Budin's chinchilla rat 
Abrocoma cinerea - Ashy chinchilla rat 
Abrocoma famatina - Famatina chinchilla rat 
Abrocoma schistacea - Sierra del Tontal chinchilla rat 
Abrocoma uspallata - Uspallata chinchilla rat
Abrocoma vaccarum - Punta de Vacas chinchilla rat 
Genus Cuscomys
Cuscomys ashanika - Asháninka arboreal chinchilla rat
Cuscomys oblativus - Machu Picchu arboreal chinchilla rat

Family Echimyidae

Subfamily Dactylomyinae
Genus Dactylomys
Dactylomys boliviensis - Bolivian bamboo rat
Dactylomys dactylinus - Amazon bamboo rat
Dactylomys peruanus - Peruvian bamboo rat
Genus Kannabateomys
Kannabateomys amblyonyx - southern bamboo rat 
Genus Olallamys
Olallamys albicauda - white-tailed olalla rat
Olallamys edax - greedy olalla rat

Subfamily Echimyinae
Genus Callistomys
Callistomys pictus - painted tree rat 
Genus Diplomys

Diplomys caniceps - Colombian soft-furred spiny rat
Diplomys labilis - rufous soft-furred spiny-rat
Genus Echimys
Echimys chrysurus - white-faced tree rat
Echimys saturnus - dark tree rat
Echimys vieirai - Vieira's spiny tree-rat
Genus Hoplomys
Hoplomys gymnurus - Armored rat
Genus Isothrix
Isothrix barbarabrownae - Barbara Brown's brush-tailed rat
Isothrix bistriata - yellow-crowned brush-tailed rat
Isothrix negrensis - Rio Negro brush-tailed rat
Isothrix pagurus - plain brush-tailed rat
Isothrix sinnamariensis - Sinnamary brush-tailed rat
Genus Makalata
Makalata didelphoides - armored spiny rat
Makalata macrura - Long-tailed armored tree-rat
Makalata obscura - Dusky spiny tree-rat
Makalata rhipidura - Peruvian armored tree-rat
Genus Pattonomys
Pattonomys occasius - Bare-tailed armored tree-rat
Pattonomys semivillosus - speckled tree rat
Genus Phyllomys
Phyllomys blainvilii - Golden Atlantic tree-rat
Phyllomys brasiliensis- Orange-brown Atlantic tree-rat
Phyllomys dasythrix - Drab Atlantic tree-rat
Phyllomys kerri - Kerr's Atlantic tree-rat
Phyllomys lamarum - Pallid Atlantic tree-rat
Phyllomys lundi - Lund's Atlantic tree-rat
Phyllomys mantiqueirensis - Mantiqueira Atlantic tree-rat
Phyllomys medius - Long-furred Atlantic tree-rat
Phyllomys nigrispinus - black-spined Atlantic tree rat
Phyllomys pattoni - Rusty-sided Atlantic tree-rat
Phyllomys sulinus - Southern Atlantic tree-rat
Phyllomys thomasi - Giant Atlantic tree-rat
Phyllomys unicolor - Short-furred Atlantic tree-rat
Genus Santamartamys
Santamartamys rufodorsalis - Red-crested tree-rat
Genus Toromys
Toromys grandis - Giant tree-rat

Subfamily Eumysopinae
 Genus Carterodon
Carterodon sulcidens - Owl's spiny rat
 Genus Clyomys
Clyomys bishopi? - Bishop's fossorial spiny rat
Clyomys laticeps - Broad-headed spiny rat
 Genus Euryzygomatomys
Euryzygomatomys guiara - Brandt's guiara
Euryzygomatomys spinosus - Fischer's guiara
 Genus Lonchothrix
Lonchothrix emiliae - tuft-tailed spiny tree rat

 Genus Mesomys
Mesomys hispidus - spiny tree rat
Mesomys leniceps - woolly-headed spiny tree rat
Mesomys occultus - Tufted-tailed spiny tree-rat
Mesomys stimulax - Surinam spiny tree rat
 Genus Proechimys
Proechimys canicollis group
Proechimys canicollis - Colombian spiny rat
Proechimys decumanus group
Proechimys decumanus - Pacific spiny rat
Proechimys echinothrix group
Proechimys echinothrix - Stiff-spine spiny rat
Proechimys gardneri group
Proechimys gardneri - Gardner's spiny rat
Proechimys kulinae - Kulina spiny rat
Proechimys pattoni - Patton's spiny rat
Proechimys goeldii group
Proechimys goeldii - Goeldi's spiny rat
Proechimys quadruplicatus - Napo spiny rat
Proechimys steerei - Steere's spiny rat
Proechimys guyannensis group
Proechimys guyannensis - Guyenne spiny rat
Proechimys roberti - Roberto's spiny rat
Proechimys longicaudatus group
Proechimys brevicauda - Huallaga spiny rat
Proechimys cuvieri - Cuvier's spiny rat
Proechimys longicaudatus - long-tailed spiny rat
Proechimys semispinosus group
Proechimys oconnelli - O'Connell's spiny rat
Proechimys semispinosus - Tome's spiny rat
Proechimys simonsi group
Proechimys simonsi - Simon's spiny rat
Proechimys trinitatus group
Proechimys trinitatus - Trinidad spiny rat
Proechimys chrysaeolus - Boyaca spiny rat
Proechimys guairae - Guaira spiny rat
Proechimys hoplomyoides - Guyanan spiny rat
Proechimys magdalenae - Magdelena spiny rat
Proechimys mincae - minca spiny rat
Proechimys poliopus - gray-footed spiny rat
Proechimys urichi - Sucre spiny rat
Proechimys (Others)
Proechimys amphichoricus? - white-spined spiny rat
Proechimys cayennensis? - Cayenne spiny rat
Proechimys oris? - Para spiny rat
 Genus Thrichomys
Thrichomys apereoides - Common punaré
Thrichomys fosteri - Foster's punaré
Thrichomys inermis - Highlands punaré
Thrichomys laurentius - Sao Lourenço punaré
Thrichomys pachyurus - Paraguayan punaré
 Genus Trinomys
Trinomys albispinus - White-spined Atlantic spiny rat
Trinomys dimidiatus - Atlantic spiny rat
Trinomys eliasi - Elias's Atlantic spiny rat
Trinomys gratiosus - Gracile Atlantic spiny rat
Trinomys iheringi - Ihering's Atlantic spiny rat
Trinomys mirapitanga - Dark-caped Atlantic spiny rat
Trinomys moojeni - Moojen's Atlantic spiny rat
Trinomys myosuros - Mouse-tailed Atlantic spiny rat
Trinomys paratus - Spiked Atlantic spiny rat
Trinomys setosus - Hairy Atlantic spiny rat
Trinomys yonenagae - Yonenaga's Atlantic spiny rat

Subfamily Heteropsomyinae
Genus Puertoricomys
Puertoricomys corozalus - Corozal rat
Genus Heteropsomys
Heteropsomys antillensis - Antillean cave rat
Heteropsomys insulans - insular cave rat
Genus Brotomys
Brotomys contractus? 
Brotomys voratus - Hispaniolan edible rat [extinct]
Genus Boromys
Boromys offella - Oriente cave rat (extinct)
Boromys torrei - Torre's cave rat (extinct)

Family Capromyidae

Subfamily Capromyinae
Genus Capromys
Capromys garridoi - Garrido's hutia
Capromys pilorides - Desmarest's hutia
Capromys pilorides gundlachianus - Archipélago de Sabana hutia
Genus Mesocapromys
Mesocapromys angelcabrerai - Cabrera's hutia
Mesocapromys auritus - eared hutia
Mesocapromys melanurus - black-tailed hutia
Mesocapromys nanus - dwarf hutia
Mesocapromys sanfelipensis - San Felipe hutia
Genus Mysateles
Mysateles gundlachi? - Gundlach's hutia
Mysateles prehensilis - prehensile-tailed hutia
Mysateles prehensilis meridionalis - Isla De La Juventud tree hutia
Genus Geocapromys
Geocapromys brownii - Brown's hutia
Geocapromys caymanensis - Cayman hutia [extinct]
Geocapromys columbianus - Cuban hutia [extinct]
Geocapromys ingrahami - Brahamian hutia
Geocapromys megas [extinct]
Geocapromys pleistocenicus [extinct]
Geocapromys thoracatus - Swan Island hutia [extinct]

Subfamily Plagiodontinae
Genus Hyperplagiodontia
Hyperplagiodontia araeum - San Rafael hutia
Genus Plagiodontia
Plagiodontia aedium - Hispaniolan hutia
Plagiodontia ipnaeum - Samana hutia (extinct)
Plagiodonta spelaeum - Small Haitian hutia (extinct)
Genus Rhizoplagiodontia
Rhizoplagiodontia lemkei - Lemke's hutia (extinct)

Subfamily Isolobodontinae
Genus Isolobodon
Isolobodon montanus - montane hutia (extinct)
Isolobodon portoricensis - Puerto Rican hutia (extinct)

Subfamily Hexolobodontinae
Genus Hexolobodon
Hexolobodon phenax - imposter hutia (extinct)

Family Heptaxodontidae

Subfamily Clidomyinae
Genus Clidomys
Clidomys osborni - Osborn's key mouse (extinct)

Subfamily Heptaxodontinae
Genus Elasmodontomys
Elasmodontomys obliquus - plate-toothed mouse (extinct)
Genus Quemisia
Quemisia gravis - Hispaniolan giant hutia (extinct)
Genus Amblyrhiza
Amblyrhiza inundata - blunt-toothed mouse (extinct)

Family Myocastoridae
Genus Myocastor
Myocastor coypus - coypu or nutria

Suborder Anomaluromorpha

Family Anomaluridae

Subfamily Anomalurinae
Genus Anomalurus
Anomalurus beecrofti - Beecroft's flying squirrel
Anomalurus derbianus - Lord Derby's scaly-tailed squirrel
Anomalurus peli - Pel's scaly-tailed squirrel
Anomalurus pusillus - dwarf scaly-tailed squirrel

Subfamily Zenkerellinae
Genus Idiurus
Idiurus zenkeri - pygmy scaly-tailed squirrel
Idiurus macrotis - long-eared scaly-tailed squirrel
Genus Zenkerella
Zenkerella insignis - Cameroon scaly-tailed squirrel

Family Pedetidae
Genus Pedetes
Pedetes capensis - South African springhare
Pedetes surdaster - East African springhare

Suborder Sciuromorpha

Family Aplodontidae
Genus Aplodontia
Aplodontia rufa - mountain beaver

Family Sciuridae

Subfamily Ratufinae
Genus Ratufa
Ratufa affinis - pale giant squirrel
Ratufa bicolor - black giant squirrel
Ratufa indica - Indian giant squirrel
Ratufa macroura - grizzled giant squirrel

Subfamily Sciurillinae
Genus Sciurillus
Sciurillus pusillus - Neotropical pygmy squirrel

Subfamily Sciurinae

Tribe Sciurini
Genus Microsciurus
Microsciurus alfari - Central American dwarf squirrel
Microsciurus flaviventer - Amazon dwarf squirrel or Guianan squirrel
Microsciurus mimulus - western dwarf squirrel
Microsciurus santanderensis - Santander dwarf squirrel
Genus Rheithrosciurus
Rheithrosciurus macrotis - tufted ground squirrel
Genus Sciurus
Subgenus Guerlinguetus
Sciurus aestuans - Brazilian squirrel or Guianan squirrel
Sciurus argentinius - South Yungas red squirrel
Sciurus gilvigularis - yellow-throated squirrel
Sciurus granatensis - red-tailed squirrel
Sciurus ignitus - Bolivian squirrel
Sciurus ingrami - Ingram's squirrel
Sciurus pucheranii - Andean squirrel
Sciurus richmondi - Richmond's squirrel
Sciurus sanborni - Sanborn's squirrel
Sciurus stramineus - Guayaquil squirrel
Subgenus Hadrosciurus
Sciurus flammifer - fiery squirrel
Sciurus pyrrhinus - Junín red squirrel
Subgenus Hesperosciurus
Sciurus griseus - western gray squirrel
Subgenus Otosciurus
Sciurus aberti - Abert's squirrel
Subgenus Sciurus
Sciurus alleni - Allen's squirrel
Sciurus arizonensis - Arizona gray squirrel
Sciurus aureogaster - Mexican gray squirrel
Sciurus carolinensis - eastern gray squirrel
Sciurus colliaei - Collie's squirrel
Sciurus deppei - Deppe's squirrel
Sciurus lis - Japanese squirrel
Sciurus meridionalis - Calabrian black squirrel
Sciurus nayaritensis - Mexican fox squirrel
Sciurus niger - eastern fox squirrel
Sciurus oculatus - Peters's squirrel
Sciurus variegatoides - variegated squirrel
Sciurus vulgaris - Eurasian red squirrel
Sciurus yucatanensis - Yucatán squirrel
Subgenus Tenes
Sciurus anomalus - Persian squirrel
Subgenus Urosciurus
Sciurus igniventris - northern Amazon red squirrel
Sciurus spadiceus - southern Amazon red squirrel
Genus Syntheosciurus
Syntheosciurus brochus - Bangs's mountain squirrel
Genus Tamiasciurus
Tamiasciurus douglasii - Douglas's squirrel
Tamiasciurus douglasii mearnsi - Mearns's squirrel
Tamiasciurus fremonti - Southwestern red squirrel
Tamiasciurus fremonti grahamensis - Mount Graham red squirrel
Tamiasciurus hudsonicus - American red squirrel

Tribe Pteromyini
Genus Aeretes
Aeretes melanopterus - North Chinese flying squirrel
Genus Aeromys
Aeromys tephromelas - black flying squirrel
Aeromys thomasi - Thomas' flying squirrel
Genus Belomys
Belomys pearsonii - hairy-footed flying squirrel
Genus Biswamoyopterus
Biswamoyopterus biswasi - Namdapha flying squirrel
Biswamoyopterus gaoligongensis - Mount Gaoligong flying squirrel
Biswamoyopterus laoensis - Laotian giant flying squirrel
Genus Eoglaucomys
Eoglaucomys fimbriatus - Kashmir flying squirrel
Eoglaucomys fimbriatus baberi - Afghan flying squirrel
Genus Eupetaurus
Eupetaurus cinereus - Western woolly flying squirrel
Eupetaurus nivamons - Yunnan woolly flying squirrel
Eupetaurus tibetensis - Tibetan woolly flying squirrel
Genus Glaucomys
Glaucomys oregonensis - Humboldt's flying squirrel
Glaucomys sabrinus - northern flying squirrel
Glaucomys volans - southern flying squirrel
Genus Hylopetes
Hylopetes alboniger - particolored flying squirrel
Hylopetes bartelsi - Bartel's flying squirrel
Hylopetes electilis - Hainan flying squirrel
Hylopetes lepidus? - gray-cheeked flying squirrel
Hylopetes nigripes - Palawan flying squirrel
Hylopetes phayrei - Indochinese flying squirrel
Hylopetes platyurus - gray-cheeked flying squirrel
Hylopetes sagitta - Arrow flying squirrel
Hylopetes sipora - Sipora flying squirrel
Hylopetes spadiceus - red-cheeked flying squirrel
Hylopetes winstoni - Sumatran flying squirrel
Genus Iomys
Iomys horsfieldii - Javanese flying squirrel
Iomys sipora - Mentawi flying squirrel
Genus Petaurillus
Petaurillus emiliae - lesser pygmy flying squirrel
Petaurillus hosei - Hose's pygmy flying squirrel
Petaurillus kinlochii - Selangor pygmy flying squirrel
Genus Petaurista
Petaurista alborufus - red and white giant flying squirrel
Petaurista elegans - spotted giant flying squirrel
Petaurista leucogenys - Japanese giant flying squirrel
Petaurista magnificus - Hodgson's giant flying squirrel
Petaurista mechukaensis - Mechuka giant flying squirrel
Petaurista mishmiensis - Mishmi giant flying squirrel
Petaurista nobilis - Bhutan giant flying squirrel
Petaurista petaurista - red giant flying squirrel
Petaurista philippensis - Indian giant flying squirrel
Petaurista siangensis - Hodgson's giant flying squirrel
Petaurista xanthotis - Mebo giant flying squirrel
Genus Petinomys
Petinomys crinitus - Mindanao flying squirrel
Petinomys fuscocapillus - Travancore flying squirrel
Petinomys genibarbis - whiskered flying squirrel
Petinomys hageni - Hagen's flying squirrel
Petinomys lugens - Siberut flying squirrel
Petinomys mindanensis - Mindanao flying squirrel
Petinomys sagitta - arrow flying squirrel
Petinomys setosus - Temminck's flying squirrel
Petinomys vordermanni - Vordermann's  flying squirrel
Genus Pteromys
Pteromys momonga - Japanese flying squirrel
Pteromys volans - Siberian flying squirrel
Genus Pteromyscus
Pteromyscus pulverulentus - smoky  flying squirrel
Genus Trogopterus
Trogopterus xanthipes - complex-toothed flying squirrel

Subfamily Callosciurinae
Genus Callosciurus
Callosciurus adamsi - ear-spot squirrel
Callosciurus albescens - Kloss's squirrel
Callosciurus baluensis - Kinabalu squirrel
Callosciurus caniceps - gray-bellied squirrel
Callosciurus erythraeus - Pallas's squirrel
Callosciurus finlaysonii - Finlayson's squirrel
Callosciurus flavimanus?
Callosciurus honkhoaiensis - Hon Khoai squirrel
Callosciurus inornatus - inornate squirrel
Callosciurus melanogaster - Mentawai squirrel
Callosciurus nigrovittatus - black-striped squirrel
Callosciurus notatus - plantain squirrel
Callosciurus orestes - Borneo black-banded squirrel
Callosciurus phayrei - Phayre's squirrel
Callosciurus prevostii - Prevost's squirrel
Callosciurus pygerythrus - Irrawaddy squirrel
Callosciurus quinquestriatus - Anderson's squirrel
Genus Dremomys
Dremomys everetti - Bornean mountain ground squirrel
Dremomys gularis - red-throated squirrel
Dremomys lokriah - orange-bellied Himalayan squirrel
Dremomys pernyi - Perny's long-nosed squirrel
Dremomys pyrrhomerus - red-hipped squirrel
Dremomys rufigenis - Asian red-cheeked squirrel
Genus Exilisciurus
Exilisciurus concinnus - Philippine pygmy squirrel
Exilisciurus exilis - least pygmy squirrel
Exilisciurus whiteheadi - tufted pygmy squirrel
Genus Funambulus
Subgenus Funambulus
Funambulus layardi - Layard's palm squirrel
Funambulus obscurus - Dusky palm squirrel
Funambulus palmarum - Indian palm squirrel
Funambulus sublineatus - dusky palm squirrel
Funambulus tristriatus - jungle palm squirrel
Subgenus Prasadsciurus
Funambulus pennantii - northern palm squirrel
Genus Glyphotes
Glyphotes simus - sculptor squirrel
Genus Hyosciurus
Hyosciurus heinrichi - montane long-nosed squirrel
Hyosciurus ileile - lowland long-nosed squirrel
Genus Lariscus
Lariscus hosei - four-striped ground squirrel
Lariscus insignis - three-striped ground squirrel
Lariscus niobe - Niobe ground squirrel
Lariscus obscurus - Mentawai three-striped squirrel
Genus Menetes
Menetes berdmorei - Berdmore's ground squirrel
Genus Nannosciurus
Nannosciurus melanotis - black-eared squirrel
Genus Prosciurillus
Prosciurillus abstrusus - secretive dwarf squirrel
Prosciurillus alstoni - Alston's Sulawesi dwarf squirrel
Prosciurillus leucomus - whitish dwarf squirrel
Prosciurillus murinus - Celebes dwarf squirrel
Prosciurillus rosenbergii - Sanghir squirrel
Prosciurillus topapuensis - Roux's Sulawesi dwarf squirrel
Prosciurillus weberi - Weber's dwarf squirrel
Genus Rhinosciurus
Rhinosciurus laticaudatus - shrew-faced squirrel
Genus Rubrisciurus
Rubrisciurus rubriventer - red-bellied squirrel
Genus Sundasciurus
Sundasciurus altitudinis - Sumatran mountain squirrel
Sundasciurus brookei - Brooke's squirrel
Sundasciurus davensis - Davao squirrel
Sundasciurus everetti - Bornean mountain ground squirrel
Sundasciurus fraterculus - fraternal squirrel
Sundasciurus hippurus - horse-tailed squirrel
Sundasciurus hoogstraali - Busuanga squirrel
Sundasciurus jentinki - Jentink's squirrel
Sundasciurus juvencus - northern Palawan tree squirrel
Sundasciurus lowii - Low's squirrel
Sundasciurus mindanensis - Mindanao squirrel
Sundasciurus moellendorffi - Culion tree squirrel
Sundasciurus natunensis - Natuna squirrel
Sundasciurus philippinensis - Philippine tree squirrel
Sundasciurus rabori - Palawan montane squirrel
Sundasciurus robinsoni - Robinson's squirrel
Sundasciurus samarensis - Samar squirrel
Sundasciurus steerii - southern Palawan tree squirrel
Sundasciurus tahan - Upland squirrel
Sundasciurus tenuis - slender squirrel
Genus Tamiops
Tamiops mcclellandii - Himalayan striped squirrel
Tamiops maritimus - maritime striped squirrel
Tamiops rodolphii - Cambodian striped squirrel
Tamiops swinhoei - Swinhoe's striped squirrel

Subfamily Xerinae

Tribe Xerini
Genus Atlantoxerus
Atlantoxerus getulus - Barbary ground squirrel
Genus Spermophilopsis
Spermophilopsis leptodactylus - long-clawed ground squirrel
Genus Euxerus
Euxerus erythropus - striped ground squirrel
Genus Geosciurus
Geosciurus inauris - Cape ground squirrel or South African ground squirrel
Geosciurus princeps - Damara ground squirrel
Genus Xerus
Xerus rutilus - unstriped ground squirrel

Tribe Protoxerini
Genus Epixerus
Epixerus ebii - Ebian's palm squirrel, Temminck's giant squirrel, western palm squirrel
Epixerus ebii wilsoni - Biafran palm squirrel
Genus Funisciurus
Funisciurus anerythrus - Thomas's rope squirrel
Funisciurus bayonii - Lunda rope squirrel
Funisciurus carruthersi - Carruther's mountain squirrel
Funisciurus congicus - Congo rope squirrel
Funisciurus isabella - Lady Burton's rope squirrel
Funisciurus lemniscatus - ribboned rope squirrel
Funisciurus leucogenys - red-cheeked rope squirrel
Funisciurus pyrropus - fire-footed rope squirrel
Funisciurus substriatus - Kintampo rope squirrel
Genus Heliosciurus
Heliosciurus gambianus - Gambian sun squirrel
Heliosciurus mutabilis - mutable sun squirrel
Heliosciurus punctatus - Small sun squirrel
Heliosciurus rufobrachium - red-legged sun squirrel
Heliosciurus ruwenzorii - Ruwenzori sun squirrel
Heliosciurus undulatus - Zanj sun squirrel
Genus Myosciurus
Myosciurus pumilio - African pygmy squirrel
Genus Paraxerus
Paraxerus alexandri - Alexander's bush squirrel
Paraxerus boehmi - Boehm's bush squirrel
Paraxerus cepapi - Smith's bush squirrel
Paraxerus cooperi - Cooper's green squirrel
Paraxerus flavovittis - striped bush squirrel
Paraxerus lucifer - African red bush squirrel
Paraxerus ochraceus - Huet's bush squirrel
Paraxerus palliatus - red bush squirrel
Paraxerus poensis - Fernando Po squirrel
Paraxerus vexillarius - Swynnerton's bush squirrel
Paraxerus vincenti - Vincent's bush squirrel
Genus Protoxerus
Protoxerus aubinnii - slender-tailed squirrel
Protoxerus stangeri - forest giant squirrel or Stanger's squirrel

Tribe Marmotini
Genus Ammospermophilus
Ammospermophilus harrisii - Harris's antelope squirrel
Ammospermophilus insularis - Espirito Santo Island squirrel
Ammospermophilus interpres - Texas antelope squirrel
Ammospermophilus leucurus - white-tailed antelope squirrel
Ammospermophilus nelsoni - Nelson's antelope squirrel
Genus Callospermophilus
Callospermophilus lateralis - golden-mantled ground squirrel
Callospermophilus madrensis - Sierra Madre ground squirrel
Callospermophilus saturatus - Cascade golden-mantled ground squirrel
Genus Cynomys
Cynomys gunnisoni - Gunnison's prairie dog
Cynomys leucurus - white-tailed prairie dog
Cynomys ludovicianus - black-tailed prairie dog
Cynomys mexicanus - Mexican prairie dog
Cynomys parvidens - Utah prairie dog
Genus Eutamias
Eutamias sibiricus - Siberian chipmunk
Genus Ictidomys
Ictidomys mexicanus - Mexican ground squirrel
Ictidomys parvidens - Rio Grande ground squirrel
Ictidomys tridecemlineatus - thirteen-lined ground squirrel
Genus Marmota
Subgenus Marmota
Marmota baibacina - gray marmot
Marmota bobak - Bobak marmot
Marmota broweri - Alaska marmot
Marmota camtschatica - black-capped marmot
Marmota caudata - long-tailed marmot
Marmota himalayana - Himalayan marmot
Marmota marmota - alpine marmot
Marmota menzbieri - Menzbier's marmot
Marmota monax - woodchuck
Marmota sibirica - Tarbagan marmot
Subgenus Petromarmota
Marmota caligata - hoary marmot
Marmota flaviventris - yellow-bellied marmot
Marmota olympus - Olympic marmot
Marmota vancouverensis - Vancouver marmot
Genus Neotamias
Neotamias alpinus - alpine chipmunk
Neotamias amoenus - yellow-pine chipmunk
Neotamias bulleri - Buller's chipmunk
Neotamias canipes - gray-footed chipmunk
Neotamias cinereicollis - gray-collared chipmunk
Neotamias dorsalis - cliff chipmunk
Neotamias durangae - Durango chipmunk
Neotamias merriami - Merriam's chipmunk
Neotamias minimus - least chipmunk
Neotamias obscurus - California chipmunk
Neotamias ochrogenys - yellow-cheeked chipmunk
Neotamias palmeri - Palmer's chipmunk
Neotamias panamintinus - Panamint chipmunk
Neotamias quadrimaculatus - long-eared chipmunk
Neotamias quadrivittatus - Colorado chipmunk
Neotamias ruficaudus - red-tailed chipmunk
Neotamias rufus - Hopi chipmunk
Neotamias senex - Allen's chipmunk
Neotamias siskiyou - Siskiyou chipmunk
Neotamias sonomae - Sonoma chipmunk
Neotamias speciosus - lodgepole chipmunk
Neotamias townsendii - Townsend's chipmunk
Neotamias umbrinus - Uinta chipmunk
Genus Notocitellus
Notocitellus adocetus - tropical ground squirrel
Notocitellus annulatus - ring-tailed ground squirrel
Genus Otospermophilus
Otospermophilus atricapillus - Baja California rock squirrel
Otospermophilus beecheyi - California ground squirrel
Otospermophilus variegatus - rock squirrel
Genus Poliocitellus
Poliocitellus franklinii - Franklin's ground squirrel
Genus Sciurotamias
Sciurotamias davidianus - Père David's rock squirrel
Sciurotamias forresti - Forrest's rock squirrel
Genus Spermophilus
Spermophilus alashanicus - Alashan ground squirrel
Spermophilus brevicauda - Brandt's ground squirrel
Spermophilus citellus - European ground squirrel
Spermophilus dauricus - Daurian ground squirrel
Spermophilus erythrogenys - red-cheeked ground squirrel
Spermophilus fulvus - yellow ground squirrel
Spermophilus major - russet ground squirrel
Spermophilus musicus - Caucasian mountain ground squirrel
Spermophilus nilkaensis - Tian Shan ground squirrel
Spermophilus pallidicauda - Pallid ground squirrel
Spermophilus pygmaeus - little ground squirrel
Spermophilus relictus - Relict ground squirrel
Spermophilus suslicus - Speckled ground squirrel
Spermophilus taurensis - Taurus ground squirrel
Spermophilus xanthoprymnus - Asia Minor ground squirrel
Genus Tamias
Tamias striatus - eastern chipmunk
Genus Urocitellus
Urocitellus armatus - Uinta ground squirrel
Urocitellus beldingi - Belding's ground squirrel
Urocitellus brunneus - Northern Idaho ground squirrel
Urocitellus canus - Merriam's ground squirrel
Urocitellus columbianus - Columbian ground squirrel
Urocitellus elegans - Wyoming ground squirrel
Urocitellus endemicus - Southern Idaho ground squirrel
Urocitellus mollis - Piute ground squirrel
Urocitellus parryii - Arctic ground squirrel
Urocitellus richardsonii - Richardson's ground squirrel
Urocitellus townsendii - Townsend's ground squirrel
Urocitellus undulatus - long-tailed ground squirrel
Urocitellus washingtoni - Washington ground squirrel
Genus Xerospermophilus
Xerospermophilus mohavensis - Mohave ground squirrel
Xerospermophilus perotensis - Perote ground squirrel
Xerospermophilus spilosoma - spotted ground squirrel
Xerospermophilus tereticaudus - round-tailed ground squirrel

Family Gliridae

Subfamily Graphiurinae
Genus Graphiurus
Graphiurus angolensis - Angolan African dormouse
Graphiurus christyi - Christy's dormouse
Graphiurus crassicaudatus - Jentink's dormouse
Graphiurus johnstoni - Johnston's African dormouse
Graphiurus kelleni - Kellen's dormouse
Graphiurus lorraineus - Lorrain dormouse
Graphiurus microtis - small-eared dormouse
Graphiurus monardi - Monard's dormouse
Graphiurus murinus - woodland dormouse
Graphiurus nagtglasii - Nagtglas's African dormouse
Graphiurus ocularis - spectacled dormouse
Graphiurus platyops - rock dormouse
Graphiurus rupicola - stone dormouse
Graphiurus surdus - silent dormouse
Graphiurus walterverheyeni - Walter Verheyen's African dormouse

Subfamily Leithiinae
Genus Chaetocauda
Chaetocauda sichuanensis - Chinese dormouse
Genus Dryomys
Dryomys laniger - woolly dormouse
Dryomys niethammeri - Niethammer's forest dormouse
Dryomys nitedula - forest dormouse
Genus Eliomys
Eliomys melanurus - Asian garden dormouse
Eliomys munbyanus - Maghreb garden dormouse
Eliomys quercinus - garden dormouse
Genus Muscardinus
Muscardinus avellanarius - hazel dormouse
Genus Myomimus
 Myomimus personatus - masked mouse-tailed dormouse
 Myomimus roachi - Roach's mouse-tailed dormouse
 Myomimus setzeri - Setzer's mouse-tailed dormouse
Genus Selevinia
Selevinia betpakdalaensis - desert dormouse

Subfamily Glirinae
Genus Glirulus
Glirulus japonicus - Japanese dormouse
Genus Glis
Glis glis - edible dormouse
Glis persicus - Iranian edible dormouse

Suborder Castorimorpha

Family Castoridae
Genus Castor
Castor canadensis - Canadian beaver
Castor fiber - Eurasian beaver

Family Geomyidae
Genus Cratogeomys
Cratogeomys castanops - Yellow-faced pocket gopher
Cratogeomys fulvescens - Oriental Basin pocket gopher
Cratogeomys fumosus - Smoky pocket gopher
Cratogeomys goldmani - Goldman's pocket gopher
Cratogeomys merriami - Merriam's pocket gopher
Cratogeomys perotensis - Perote pocket gopher
Cratogeomys planiceps - Flat-headed pocket gopher
Genus Geomys
Geomys arenarius - desert pocket gopher
Geomys attwateri - Attwater's pocket gopher
Geomys breviceps - Baird's pocket gopher
Geomys bursarius - plains pocket gopher
Geomys jugossicularis - Hall's pocket gopher
Geomys knoxjonesi - Knox Jones's pocket gopher
Geomys lutescens - Sand Hills pocket gopher
Geomys personatus - Texas pocket gopher
Geomys pinetis - southeastern pocket gopher
Geomys streckeri - Strecker's pocket gopher
Geomys texensis - Llano pocket gopher
Geomys tropicalis - tropical pocket gopher
Genus Heterogeomys
Heterogeomys cavator - Chiriqui pocket gopher
Heterogeomys cherriei - Cherrie's pocket gopher
Heterogeomys dariensis - Darien pocket gopher
Heterogeomys heterodus - variable pocket gopher
Heterogeomys hispidus - hispid pocket gopher
Heterogeomys lanius - big pocket gopher
Heterogeomys underwoodi - Underwood's pocket gopher
Genus Orthogeomys
Orthogeomys cuniculus? - Oaxacan pocket gopher
Orthogeomys grandis - giant pocket gopher
Orthogeomys matagalpae? - Nicaraguan pocket gopher
Orthogeomys thaeleri? - Thaeler's pocket gopher
Genus Pappogeomys
Pappogeomys bulleri - Buller's pocket gopher
Pappogeomys bulleri alcorni - Alcorn's pocket gopher
Genus Thomomys
Subgenus Megascapheus
Thomomys atrovarius - Black-and-Brown pocket gopher
Thomomys bottae - Botta's pocket gopher
Thomomys bulbivorus - Camas pocket gopher
Thomomys nayarensis - Nayar pocket gopher
Thomomys sheldoni - Sierra Madre Occidental pocket gopher
Thomomys townsendii - Townsend's pocket gopher
Thomomys umbrinus - southern pocket gopher
Subgenus Thomomys
Thomomys clusius - Wyoming pocket gopher
Thomomys idahoensis - Idaho pocket gopher
Thomomys mazama - western pocket gopher
Thomomys mazama tacomensis - Tacoma pocket gopher
Thomomys monticola - mountain pocket gopher
Thomomys talpoides - northern pocket gopher
Genus Zygogeomys
Zygogeomys trichopus - Michoacan pocket gopher

Family Heteromyidae

Subfamily Dipodomyinae

 Genus Dipodomys
 Dipodomys agilis - agile kangaroo rat
 Dipodomys californicus - California kangaroo rat
 Dipodomys compactus - Gulf Coast kangaroo rat
 Dipodomys deserti - desert kangaroo rat
 Dipodomys elator - Texas kangaroo rat
 Dipodomys elephantinus - big-eared kangaroo rat
 Dipodomys gravipes - San Quintin kangaroo rat
 Dipodomys heermanni - Heerman's kangaroo rat
 Dipodomys ingens - giant kangaroo rat
 Dipodomys insularis - San Jose Island kangaroo rat
 Dipodomys merriami margaritae - Margarita Island kangaroo rat
 Dipodomys merriami - Merriam's kangaroo rat
 Dipodomys microps - chisel-toothed kangaroo rat
 Dipodomys nelsoni - Nelson's kangaroo rat
 Dipodomys nitratoides - Fresno kangaroo rat
 Dipodomys ordii - Ord's kangaroo rat
 Dipodomys panamintinus - Panamint kangaroo rat
 Dipodomys phillipsii - Phillip's kangaroo rat
 Dipodomys simulans - Dulzura kangaroo rat
 Dipodomys spectabilis - bannertail kangaroo rat
 Dipodomys stephensi - Stephen's kangaroo rat
 Dipodomys venustus - narrow-faced kangaroo rat
Genus Microdipodops
Microdipodops megacephalus - dark kangaroo mouse
Microdipodops pallidus - pale kangaroo mouse

Subfamily Heteromyinae
Genus Heteromys
Heteromys adspersus - Panamanian spiny pocket mouse
Heteromys anomalus - Trinidad spiny pocket mouse
Heteromys australis - southern spiny pocket mouse
Heteromys catopterius - Overlook spiny pocket mouse
Heteromys desmarestianus - Desmarest's spiny pocket mouse
Heteromys gaumeri - Gaumer's spiny pocket mouse
Heteromys goldmani - Goldman's spiny pocket mouse
Heteromys irroratus - Mexican spiny pocket mouse
Heteromys nelsoni - Nelson's spiny pocket mouse
Heteromys nubicolens - Cloud-dwelling spiny pocket mouse
Heteromys oasicus - Paraguaná spiny pocket mouse
Heteromys oresterus - mountain spiny pocket mouse
Heteromys pictus - painted spiny pocket mouse
Heteromys salvini - Salvin's spiny pocket mouse
Heteromys spectabilis - Jaliscan spiny pocket mouse
Heteromys teleus - Ecuadoran spiny pocket mouse

Subfamily Perognathinae

 Genus Chaetodipus
Chaetodipus arenarius - little desert pocket mouse
Chaetodipus artus - narrow-skulled pocket mouse
Chaetodipus baileyi - Bailey's pocket mouse
Chaetodipus californicus - California pocket mouse
Chaetodipus dalquesti - Dalquest's pocket mouse
Chaetodipus eremicus - Chihuahuan pocket mouse
Chaetodipus fallax - San Diego pocket mouse
Chaetodipus formosus - long-tailed pocket mouse
Chaetodipus goldmani - Goldman's pocket mouse
Chaetodipus hispidus - hispid pocket mouse
Chaetodipus intermedius - rock pocket mouse
Chaetodipus lineatus - lined pocket mouse
Chaetodipus nelsoni - Nelson's pocket mouse
Chaetodipus penicillatus - desert pocket mouse
Chaetodipus pernix - Sinaloan pocket mouse
Chaetodipus rudinoris - Baja California pocket mouse
Chaetodipus spinatus - spiny pocket mouse
Genus Perognathus
Perognathus alticola - white-eared pocket mouse
Perognathus amplus - Arizona pocket mouse
Perognathus fasciatus - olive-backed pocket mouse
Perognathus flavescens - plains pocket mouse
Perognathus flavus - silky pocket mouse
Perognathus inornatus - San Joaquin pocket mouse
Perognathus longimembris - little pocket mouse
Perognathus longimembris pacificus - Pacific pocket mouse
Perognathus merriami - Merriam's pocket mouse
Perognathus parvus - Great Basin pocket mouse

Suborder Myomorpha

Family Dipodidae

Subfamily Allactaginae
Genus Allactaga
Subgenus Allactaga
 Allactaga firouzi - Iranian jerboa
 Allactaga hotsoni - Hotson's jerboa
 Allactaga major - great jerboa
 Allactaga severtzovi - Severtzov's jerboa
Subgenus Orientallactaga
 Allactaga balikunica - Balikun jerboa
 Allactaga bullata - Gobi jerboa
 Allactaga sibirica - Mongolian five-toed jerboa
Genus Allactodipus
Allactodipus bobrinskii - Bobrinski's jerboa
Genus Pygeretmus
 Pygeretmus platyurus - lesser fat-tailed jerboa
 Pygeretmus pumilio - dwarf fat-tailed jerboa
 Pygeretmus shitkovi - greater fat-tailed jerboa
Genus Scarturus
 Scarturus elater - small five-toed jerboa
 Scarturus euphratica - Euphrates jerboa
 Scarturus tetradactyla - four-toed jerboa
 Scarturus vinogradovi - Vinogradov's jerboa
 Scarturus williamsi - Williams's jerboa

Subfamily Cardiocraniinae
Genus Cardiocranius
Cardiocranius paradoxus - five-toed pygmy jerboa
Genus Salpingotulus
Salpingotulus michaelis - Baluchistan pygmy jerboa
Genus Salpingotus
Subgenus Anguistodontus
Salpingotus crassicauda - thick-tailed pygmy jerboa
Subgenus Prosalpingotus
Salpingotus heptneri - Heptner's pygmy jerboa
Salpingotus pallidus - pallid pygmy jerboa
Salpingotus thomasi - Thomas' pygmy jerboa
Subgenus Salpingotus
Salpingotus kozlovi - Koslov's pygmy jerboa

Subfamily Dipodinae
Genus Dipus
 Dipus sagitta - northern three-toed jerboa
Genus Eremodipus
 Eremodipus lichtensteini - Lichtenstein's jerboa
Genus Jaculus
 Jaculus blanfordi - Blanford's jerboa
 Jaculus hirtipes - African hammada jerboa
 Jaculus jaculus - lesser Egyptian jerboa
 Jaculus orientalis - greater Egyptian jerboa
 Jaculus thaleri - Thaler's jerboa
 Jaculus turcmenicus? - Turkmen jerboa
Genus Paradipus
 Paradipus ctenodactylus - comb-toed jerboa
Genus Stylodipus
 Stylodipus andrewsi - Andrew's three-toed jerboa
 Stylodipus sungorus - Mongolian three-toed jerboa
 Stylodipus telum - thick-tailed three-toed jerboa

Subfamily Euchoreutinae
Genus Euchoreutes
Euchoreutes naso - long-eared jerboa

Subfamily Sicistinae
Genus Sicista
Sicista armenica - Armenian birch mouse
Sicista betulina - northern birch mouse
Sicista caucasica - Caucasian birch mouse
Sicista caudata - long-tailed birch mouse
Sicista cimlanica - Tsimlyansk birch mouse
Sicista concolor - Chinese birch mouse
Sicista kazbegica - Kazbeg birch mouse
Sicista kluchorica - Kluchor birch mouse
Sicista loriger - Nordmann's birch mouse
Sicista napaea - Altai birch mouse
Sicista pseudonapaea - gray birch mouse
Sicista severtzovi - Severtzov's birch mouse
Sicista strandi - Strand's birch mouse
Sicista subtilis - southern birch mouse
Sicista talgarica - Talgar birch mouse
Sicista terskeica - Terskey birch mouse
Sicista tianshanica - Tien Shan birch mouse
Sicista trizona - Hungarian birch mouse
Sicista zhetysuica - Zhetysu birch mouse

Subfamily Zapodinae
Genus Eozapus
Eozapus setchuanus - Chinese jumping mouse
Genus Napaeozapus
Napaeozapus insignis - woodland jumping mouse
Genus Zapus
Zapus hudsonius - Northern meadow jumping mouse
Zapus hudsonius preblei - Preble's meadow jumping mouse
Zapus luteus - Southern meadow jumping mouse
Zapus montanus - Central Pacific jumping mouse
Zapus oregonus - Oregon jumping mouse
Zapus pacificus - South Pacific jumping mouse
Zapus princeps - Southwestern jumping mouse
Zapus saltator - Northwestern jumping mouse
Zapus trinotatus - North Pacific jumping mouse

Family Platacanthomyidae
Genus Platacanthomys
Platacanthomys lasiurus - Malabar spiny dormouse
Genus Typhlomys
Typhlomys cinereus - Chapa pygmy dormouse

Family Spalacidae

Subfamily Myospalacinae
Genus Eospalax
Eospalax fontanierii - Chinese zokor
Eospalax rothschildi - Rothschild's zokor
Eospalax smithii - Smith's zokor
Genus Myospalax
Myospalax aspalax - false zokor
Myospalax epsilanus? - Manchurian zokor
Myospalax myospalax - Siberian zokor
Myospalax psilurus - Transbaikal zokor

Subfamily Rhizomyinae
Genus Cannomys
Cannomys badius - lesser bamboo rat
Genus Rhizomys
Rhizomys pruinosus - hoary bamboo rat
Rhizomys sinensis - Chinese bamboo rat
Rhizomys sumatrensis - large bamboo rat

Subfamily Tachyoryctinae
Genus Tachyoryctes
Tachyoryctes ankoliae - Ankole mole rat
Tachyoryctes annectens - Mianzini mole rat
Tachyoryctes audax - audacious mole rat
Tachyoryctes daemon - demon mole rat
Tachyoryctes ibeanus - Kenyan African mole rat
Tachyoryctes macrocephalus - big-headed mole rat
Tachyoryctes naivashae - Naivasha mole rat
Tachyoryctes rex - king mole rat
Tachyoryctes ruandae - Ruanda mole rat
Tachyoryctes ruddi - Rudd's mole rat
Tachyoryctes spalacinus - Embi mole rat
Tachyoryctes splendens - East African mole rat
Tachyoryctes storeyi - Storey's African mole rat

Subfamily Spalacinae
Genus Nannospalax
Nannospalax carmeli? - Mt. Carmel blind mole rat
Nannospalax ehrenbergi? - Middle East blind mole rat
Nannospalax galili? - Upper Galilee Mountains blind mole rat
Nannospalax golani? - Golan Heights blind mole rat
Nannospalax leucodon - lesser blind mole rat
Nannospalax judaei? - Judean Mountains blind mole rat
Nannospalax nehringi? - Nehring's blind mole rat
Nannospalax xanthodon - Anatolian blind mole-rat
Genus Spalax
Spalax antiquus - Mehely's blind mole-rat
Spalax arenarius - sandy mole rat
Spalax giganteus - giant mole rat
Spalax graecus - Bukovin mole rat
Spalax istricus - Oltenia blind mole-rat
Spalax microphthalmus - greater mole rat
Spalax munzuri? - Munzur mole-rat
Spalax uralensis - Kazakhstan blind mole rat
Spalax zemni - Podolsk mole rat

Family Calomyscidae
Genus Calomyscus
Calomyscus bailwardi - Zagros mouse-like hamster
Calomyscus baluchi - Balochistan mouse-like hamster
Calomyscus elburzensis - Elburz mouse-like hamster
Calomyscus grandis - Noble mouse-like hamster
Calomyscus hotsoni - Makran mouse-like hamster
Calomyscus mystax - Turkmen mouse-like hamster
Calomyscus tsolovi - Syrian mouse-like hamster from
Calomyscus urartensis - Azerbaijani mouse-like hamster

Family Nesomyidae

Subfamily Petromyscinae
Genus Petromyscus
Petromyscus barbouri - Barbour's rock mouse
Petromyscus collinus - pygmy rock mouse
Petromyscus monticularis - Brukkaros pygmy rock mouse
Petromyscus shortridgei - Shortridge's rock mouse

Subfamily Delanymyinae
Genus Delanymys
Delanymys brooksi - Delany's swamp mouse

Subfamily Dendromurinae
Genus Dendromus
Dendromus insignis - remarkable climbing mouse
Dendromus kahuziensis - Mount Kahuzi climbing mouse
Dendromus kivu? - Kivu climbing mouse
Dendromus lachaisei - Lachaise's climbing mouse
Dendromus leucostomus - Monard's African climbing mouse
Dendromus lovati - Lovat's climbing mouse
Dendromus melanotis - gray climbing mouse
Dendromus mesomelas - Brant's climbing mouse
Dendromus messorius - banana climbing mouse
Dendromus mystacalis - chestnut climbing mouse
Dendromus nyasae - Kivu climbing mouse
Dendromus nyikae - Nyika climbing mouse
Dendromus oreas - Cameroon climbing mouse
Dendromus ruppi - Rupp's African climbing mouse
Dendromus vernayi - Vernay's climbing mouse
Genus Dendroprionomys
Dendroprionomys rousseloti - velvet climbing mouse
Genus Malacothrix
Malacothrix typica - gerbil mouse
Genus Megadendromus
Megadendromus nikolausi - Nikolaus's mouse
Genus Prionomys
Prionomys batesi - Dollman's tree mouse
Genus Steatomys
Steatomys bocagei - Bocage's African fat mouse
Steatomys caurinus - northwestern fat mouse
Steatomys cuppedius - dainty fat mouse
Steatomys jacksoni - Jackson's fat mouse
Steatomys krebsii - Kreb's fat mouse
Steatomys opimus - Pousargue's African fat mouse
Steatomys parvus - tiny fat mouse
Steatomys pratensis - fat mouse

Subfamily Mystromyinae
Genus Mystromys
Mystromys albicaudatus - white-tailed rat or white-tailed mouse

Subfamily Cricetomyinae
Genus Beamys
Beamys hindei - long-tailed pouched rat
Beamys major - greater long-tailed pouched rat
Genus Cricetomys
Cricetomys ansorgei - Southern giant pouched rat
Cricetomys emini - Emin's giant pouched rat
Cricetomys gambianus - Gambian giant pouched rat
Cricetomys kivuensis - Kivu giant pouched rat
Genus Saccostomus
Saccostomus campestris - South African pouched mouse
Saccostomus mearnsi - Mearns's pouched mouse

Subfamily Nesomyinae
Genus Brachytarsomys
Brachytarsomys albicauda - white-tailed rat
Brachytarsomys mahajambaensis - (extinct)
Brachytarsomys villosa - hairy-tailed antsangy
Genus Brachyuromys
Brachyuromys betsileoensis - Betsileo short-tailed rat
Brachyuromys ramirohitra - gregarious short-tailed rat
Genus Eliurus
Eliurus antsingy - Tsingy tufted-tailed rat
Eliurus carletoni - Ankarana Special Reserve tufted-tailed rat
Eliurus danieli - Daniel's tufted-tailed rat
Eliurus ellermani - Ellerman's tufted-tailed rat
Eliurus grandidieri - Grandidier's tufted-tailed rat
Eliurus majori - Major's tufted-tailed rat
Eliurus minor - lesser tufted-tailed rat
Eliurus myoxinus - dormouse tufted-tailed rat
Eliurus penicillatus - white-tipped tufted-tailed rat
Eliurus petteri - Petter's tufted-tailed rat
Eliurus tanala - Tanala tufted-tailed rat
Eliurus webbi - Webb's tufted-tailed rat
Genus Gymnuromys
Gymnuromys roberti - voalavoanala
Genus Hypogeomys
Hypogeomys antimena - Malagasy giant rat
Hypogeomys australis - (extinct)
Genus Macrotarsomys
Macrotarsomys bastardi - bastard big-footed mouse
Macrotarsomys ingens - greater big-footed mouse
Macrotarsomys petteri - Petter's big-footed mouse
Genus Monticolomys
Monticolomys koopmani - Koopman's montane voalavo
Genus Nesomys
Nesomys audeberti - white-bellied nesomys
Nesomys lambertoni - western nesomys
Nesomys narindaensis - (extinct)
Nesomys rufus - island mouse
Genus Voalavo
Voalavo antsahabensis - Eastern voalavo
Voalavo gymnocaudus - Northern voalavo

Family Cricetidae

Subfamily Lophiomyinae

Genus Lophiomys
Lophiomys imhausi - maned rat or crested rat

Subfamily Cricetinae
Genus Allocricetulus
Allocricetulus curtatus - Mongolian hamster
Allocricetulus eversmanni - Eversmann's hamster
Genus Cansumys
Cansumys canus - Gansu hamster
Genus Cricetulus
Cricetulus alticola - Tibetan ratlike hamster
Cricetulus barabensis - Chinese striped hamster
Cricetulus griseus - Chinese hamster
Cricetulus kamensis - Kam ratlike hamster
Cricetulus lama - Lama dwarf hamster
Cricetulus longicaudatus - long-tailed ratlike hamster
Cricetulus migratorius - grey ratlike hamster
Cricetulus sokolovi - Sokolov's ratlike hamster
Genus Cricetus
Cricetus cricetus - European hamster or black-bellied hamster
Genus Mesocricetus
Mesocricetus auratus - golden hamster
Mesocricetus brandti - Turkish hamster
Mesocricetus newtoni - Romanian hamster
Mesocricetus raddei - Ciscaucasian hamster
Genus Phodopus
Phodopus campbelli - Campbell's dwarf hamster
Phodopus roborovski - Roborovski's (desert) dwarf hamster
Phodopus sungorus - winter white (Dzhungarian) dwarf hamster
Genus Tscherskia
Tscherskia triton - greater long-tailed hamster

Subfamily Arvicolinae
Genus Alticola
Alticola albicaudus - white-tailed mountain vole
Alticola argentatus - silver mountain vole
Alticola barakshin - Gobi Altai mountain vole
Alticola lemminus - lemming vole
Alticola macrotis - large-eared vole
Alticola montosa - Central Kashmir vole
Alticola olchonensis - Lake Baikal mountain vole
Alticola roylei - Royle's mountain vole
Alticola semicanus - Mongolian silver vole
Alticola stoliczkanus - Stoliczka's mountain vole
Alticola strelzowi - flat-headed vole
Alticola tuvinicus - Tuva silver vole
Genus Arborimus
Arborimus albipes - white-footed vole
Arborimus longicaudus - red tree vole
Arborimus pomo - Sonoma tree vole
Genus Arvicola
Arvicola amphibius - European (or northern) water vole
Arvicola sapidus - southwestern (or southern) water vole
Arvicola scherman - montane water vole
Genus Blanfordimys
Blanfordimys afghanus - Afghan vole
Blanfordimys bucharicus - Bucharian vole
Blanfordimys juldaschi - juniper vole
Genus Caryomys
Caryomys eva - Eva's red-backed vole
Caryomys inez - Inez's red-backed vole
Genus Chionomys
Chionomys gud - Caucasian snow vole
Chionomys nivalis - European snow vole
Chionomys roberti - Robert's snow vole
Genus Dicrostonyx
Dicrostonyx exsul? - St Lawrence Island collared lemming
Dicrostonyx groenlandicus - northern collared lemming
Dicrostonyx hudsonius - Ungava collared lemming
Dicrostonyx kilangmiutak? - Victoria collared lemming
Dicrostonyx nelsoni - Nelson's collared lemming
Dicrostonyx nunatakensis - Ogilvie Mountain collared lemming
Dicrostonyx richardsoni - Richardson's collared lemming
Dicrostonyx rubricatus? - Bering collared lemming
Dicrostonyx torquatus - Arctic lemming
Dicrostonyx unalascensis - Unalaska collared lemming
Dicrostonyx vinogradovi? - Wrangel lemming
Genus Dinaromys
Dinaromys bogdanovi - Balkan snow vole or Martino's snow vole
Genus Ellobius
Ellobius alaicus - Alai mole vole
Ellobius fuscocapillus - southern mole vole
Ellobius lutescens - Transcaucasian mole vole
Ellobius talpinus - northern mole vole
Ellobius tancrei - Zaisan mole vole
Genus Eolagurus
Eolagurus luteus - yellow steppe lemming
Eolagurus przewalskii - Przewalski's steppe lemming
Genus Eothenomys
Eothenomys cachinus - Kachin red-backed vole
Eothenomys chinensis - Pratt's vole
Eothenomys custos - southwest China vole
Eothenomys melanogaster - Pere David's vole
Eothenomys miletus - Yunnan red-backed vole
Eothenomys olitor - Chaotung vole
Eothenomys proditor - Yulungshan vole
Eothenomys wardi - Ward's red-backed vole
Genus Hyperacrius
Hyperacrius fertilis - True's vole
Hyperacrius wynnei - Murree vole
Genus Lagurus
Lagurus lagurus - steppe lemming
Genus Lasiopodomys
Lasiopodomys brandtii - Brandt's vole
Lasiopodomys fuscus - plateau vole
Lasiopodomys mandarinus - Mandarin vole
Genus Lemmiscus
Lemmiscus curtatus - sagebrush vole
Genus Lemmus
Lemmus amurensis - Amur lemming
Lemmus lemmus - Norway lemming
Lemmus nigripes - Beringian lemming
Lemmus paulus - Wrangel Island lemming
Lemmus sibiricus - Siberian brown lemming
Lemmus trimucronatus - North American brown lemming
Genus Microtus
Subgenus Microtus
Microtus agrestis - field vole
Microtus anatolicus - Anatolian vole
Microtus arvalis - common vole
Microtus cabrerae - Cabrera's vole
Microtus dogramacii - Doğramaci's vole
Microtus elbeyli - Elbeyli vole
Microtus guentheri - Günther's vole
Microtus hartingii? - Harting's vole?
Microtus ilaeus - Tien Shan vole
Microtus irani - Persian vole
Microtus kermanensis? - Baluchistan vole
Microtus lavernedii - Mediterranean field vole
Microtus levis - Southern vole
Microtus lydius - Turkish vole
Microtus mystacinus - East European vole
Microtus obscurus? - Altai vole
Microtus paradoxus - Paradox vole
Microtus qazvinensis - Qazvin vole
Microtus rosianus? - Portuguese field vole?
Microtus schidlovskii - Schidlovsky's vole
Microtus socialis - social vole
Microtus transcaspicus - Transcaspian vole
Subgenus Alexandromys
Microtus clarkei - Clarke's vole
Microtus evoronensis - evorsk vole
Microtus fortis - reed vole
Microtus gerbii - Gerbe's vole
Microtus kikuchii - Taiwan vole
Microtus limnophilus - lacustrine vole
Microtus maximowiczii - Maximowicz's vole
Microtus middendorffi - Middendorf's vole
Microtus mongolicus - Mongolian vole
Microtus montebelli - Japanese grass vole
Microtus mujanensis - muisk vole
Microtus oeconomus - tundra vole
Microtus sachalinensis - Sakhalin vole
Subgenus Hyrcanicola
Microtus schelkovnikovi - Schelkovnikov's pine vole
Subgenus Mynomes
Microtus breweri - beach vole
Microtus canicaudus - gray-tailed vole
Microtus drummondi - Western meadow vole
Microtus dukecampbelli - Florida salt marsh vole
Microtus montanus - montane vole
Microtus oregoni - creeping vole
Microtus pennsylvanicus - meadow vole
Microtus townsendii - Townsend's vole
Subgenus Pedomys
Microtus ochrogaster - prairie vole
Subgenus Pitymys
Microtus guatemalensis - Guatemalan vole
Microtus oaxacensis - Tarabundi vole
Microtus pinetorum - woodland vole
Microtus quasiater - Jalapan pine vole
Subgenus Stenocranius
Microtus gregalis - narrow-headed vole
Subgenus Terricola
Microtus bavaricus - Bavarian pine vole
Microtus brachycercus - Calabria pine vole
Microtus daghestanicus - Daghestan pine vole
Microtus duodecimcostatus - Mediterranean pine vole
Microtus felteni - Felten's vole
Microtus liechtensteini - Lichtenstein's pine vole
Microtus lusitanicus - Lusitanian pine vole
Microtus majori - Major's pine vole
Microtus multiplex - alpine pine vole
Microtus nebrodensis? - Sicilian pine vole?
Microtus savii - Savi's pine vole
Microtus subterraneus - European pine vole
Microtus tatricus - Tatra pine vole
Microtus thomasi - Thomas's pine vole
Subgenus incertae sedis
Microtus abbreviatus - insular vole
Microtus californicus - California vole
Microtus chrotorrhinus - rock vole
Microtus longicaudus - long-tailed vole
Microtus mexicanus - Mexican vole
Microtus miurus - singing vole
Microtus mogollonensis? - Mogollon vole?
Microtus richardsoni - water vole
Microtus umbrosus - Zempoaltepec vole
Microtus xanthognathus - taiga vole
 Others Microtus "Species"
Microtus hyperboreus? - North Siberian vole
Microtus kirgisorum? - Tien Shan vole
Microtus nasarovi? - Nasarov's vole
Microtus rossiaemeridionalis? - southern vole
Genus Myodes
Myodes andersoni - Japanese red-backed vole
Myodes californicus - western red-backed vole
Myodes centralis - Tien Shan red-backed vole
Myodes gapperi - southern red-backed vole
Myodes glareolus - bank vole
Myodes imaizumii - Imaizumi's red-backed vole
Myodes regulus - Royal vole
Myodes rex - Hokkaido red-backed vole
Myodes rufocanus - grey red-backed vole
Myodes rutilus - northern red-backed vole
Myodes shanseius - Shansei vole
Myodes smithii - Smith's vole
Myodes sikotanensis? - Shikotan vole
Genus Myopus
Myopus schisticolor - wood lemming
Genus Neodon
Neodon forresti - Forrest's mountain vole
Neodon irene - Irene's mountain vole
Neodon linzhiensis - Linzhi mountain vole
Neodon sikimensis - Sikkim mountain vole
Genus Neofiber
Neofiber alleni - round-tailed muskrat
Genus Ondatra
Ondatra zibethicus - muskrat or musquash
Genus Phaiomys
Phaiomys leucurus - Blyth's mountain vole
Genus Phenacomys
Phenacomys intermedius - western heather vole
Phenacomys ungava - eastern heather vole
Genus Proedromys
Proedromys bedfordi - Duke Of Bedford's vole
Proedromys liangshanensis - Liangshan vole
Genus Prometheomys
Prometheomys schaposchnikowi - long-clawed mole vole
Genus Synaptomys
Synaptomys borealis - northern bog lemming
Synaptomys cooperi - southern bog lemming
Genus Volemys
Volemys millicens - Szechuan vole
Volemys musseri - Marie's vole

Subfamily Tylomyinae

Tribe Nyctomyini
Genus Nyctomys
Nyctomys sumichrasti - Sumichrast's vesper rat
Genus Otonyctomys
Otonyctomys hatti - Hatt's vesper rat

Tribe Tylomyini
Genus Ototylomys
Ototylomys chiapensis - La Pera big-eared climbing rat
Ototylomys phyllotis - big-eared climbing rat
Genus Tylomys
Tylomys bullaris - Chiapan climbing rat
Tylomys fulviventer - fulvous-bellied climbing rat
Tylomys mirae - Mira climbing rat
Tylomys nudicaudus - Peters's climbing rat
Tylomys panamensis - Panamanian climbing rat
Tylomys tumbalensis - Tumbala climbing rat
Tylomys watsoni - Watson's climbing rat

Subfamily Neotominae
Genus Baiomys
Baiomys musculus - southern pygmy mouse
Baiomys taylori - northern pygmy mouse or ratón-pigmeo norteño
Genus Habromys
Habromys chinanteco - Chinanteco deer mouse
Habromys delicatulus - delicate deermouse
Habromys ixtlani - Ixtlán deermouse
Habromys lepturus - slender-tailed deer mouse
Habromys lophurus - crested-tailed deer mouse
Habromys schmidlyi - Schmidly's deer mouse
Habromys simulatus - Jico deer mouse
Genus Hodomys
Hodomys alleni - Allen's woodrat
Genus Isthmomys
Isthmomys flavidus - yellow isthmus rat
Isthmomys pirrensis - Mt. Pirri isthmus rat
Genus Megadontomys
Megadontomys cryophilus - Oaxaca giant deer mouse
Megadontomys nelsoni - Nelson's giant deer mouse
Megadontomys thomasi - Thomas's giant deer mouse
Genus Nelsonia
Nelsonia goldmani - Nelson and Goldman's woodrat
Nelsonia neotomodon - diminutive woodrat
Genus Neotoma
Subgenus (Neotoma)
Neotoma albigula - white-throated woodrat
Neotoma albigula varia - Turner Island woodrat
Neotoma angustapalata - Tamaulipan woodrat
Neotoma bryanti - Bryant's woodrat
Neotoma bryanti anthonyi - Anthony's woodrat
Neotoma bryanti bunkeri - Bunker's woodrat
Neotoma bryanti martinensis - San Martin Island woodrat
Neotoma chrysomelas - Nicaraguan woodrat
Neotoma devia - Arizona woodrat
Neotoma findleyi - Findley's woodrat (extinct)
Neotoma floridana - Florida woodrat or eastern woodrat
Neotoma floridana smalli - Key Largo woodrat
Neotoma goldmani - Goldman's woodrat
Neotoma insularis - Angel de la Guarda woodrat
Neotoma lepida - desert woodrat
Neotoma leucodon - White-toothed woodrat
Neotoma macrotis - big-eared woodrat
Neotoma magister - Allegheny woodrat
Neotoma mexicana - Mexican woodrat
Neotoma micropus - southern plains woodrat
Neotoma nelsoni - Nelson's woodrat
Neotoma palatina - Bolaos woodrat
Neotoma stephensi - Stephens's woodrat
Subgenus (Teanopus)
Neotoma phenax - Sonoran woodrat
Subgenus (Teonoma)
Neotoma cinerea - bushy-tailed woodrat
Neotoma fuscipes - dusky-footed woodrat
Genus Neotomodon
Neotomodon alstoni - Mexican volcano mouse
Genus Ochrotomys
Ochrotomys nuttalli - golden mouse
Genus Onychomys
Onychomys arenicola - Mearns's grasshopper mouse
Onychomys leucogaster - northern grasshopper mouse
Onychomys torridus - southern grasshopper mouse
Genus Osgoodomys
Osgoodomys banderanus - Michoacan deer mouse
Genus Peromyscus
californicus group
Peromyscus californicus - California deermouse
eremicus group
Peromyscus caniceps - Burt's deer mouse
Peromyscus dickeyi - Dickey's deer mouse
Peromyscus eremicus - cactus mouse
Peromyscus eva - Eva's desert mouse
Peromyscus fraterculus - Northern Baja deer mouse
Peromyscus guardia - Angel Island mouse [possibly extinct]
Peromyscus interparietalis - San Lorenzo mouse
Peromyscus merriami - mesquite mouse
Peromyscus pembertoni - Pemberton's deer mouse [extinct]
Peromyscus pseudocrinitus - false canyon mouse
hooperi group
Peromyscus hooperi - Hooper's mouse
crinitus group
Peromyscus crinitus - canyon mouse
maniculatus group
Peromyscus arcticus - Yukon deer mouse
Peromyscus gambellii - Gambel's deer mouse
Peromyscus keeni - Northwestern deer mouse
Peromyscus labecula - Southern deer mouse
Peromyscus maniculatus - Eastern deer mouse
Peromyscus melanotis - black-eared mouse
Peromyscus nesodytes - (Extinct)
Peromyscus oreas? - Columbian mouse
Peromyscus polionotus - oldfield mouse
Peromyscus polionotus decoloratus - Pallid beach mouse (extinct)
Peromyscus polionotus phasma - Anastasia Island beach mouse
Peromyscus sejugis - Santa Cruz mouse
Peromyscus sitkensis? - Sitka mouse
Peromyscus slevini - Slevin's mouse
Peromyscus sonoriensis - Western deer mouse
leucopus group
Peromyscus gossypinus - cotton mouse
Peromyscus gossypinus allapaticola - Key Largo cotton mouse
Peromyscus gossypinus restrictus - Chadwick Beach cotton mouse (extinct)
Peromyscus leucopus - white-footed mouse
aztecus group
Peromyscus aztecus - Aztec mouse
Peromyscus hylocetes - Transvolcanic deer mouse
Peromyscus oaxacensis - Oaxacan deer mouse
Peromyscus spicilegus - gleaning mouse
Peromyscus winkelmanni - Winkelmann's mouse
boylii group
Peromyscus beatae - Orizaba deer mouse
Peromyscus boylii - brush mouse
Peromyscus carletoni - Carleton's deer mouse
Peromyscus kilpatricki - Kilpatrick's deer mouse
Peromyscus levipes - nimble-footed mouse
Peromyscus madrensis - Tres Marias Island mouse
Peromyscus polius - Chihuahuan mouse
Peromyscus sagax - La Palma deer mouse
Peromyscus schmidlyi - Schmidly's deer mouse
Peromyscus simulus - Nayarit mouse
Peromyscus stephani - San Eseban Island mouse
truei group
Peromyscus attwateri - Texas mouse
Peromyscus bullatus - Perote mouse
Peromyscus difficilis - Zacatecan deer mouse
Peromyscus gratus - Osgood's mouse
Peromyscus laceianus - Northern white-ankled mouse
Peromyscus nasutus - northern rock mouse
Peromyscus ochraventer - El Carrizo deer mouse
Peromyscus pectoralis - Southern white-ankled mouse
Peromyscus truei - pinyon mouse
melanophrys group
Peromyscus melanophrys - plateau mouse
Peromyscus mekisturus - Puebla deer mouse
Peromyscus perfulvus - marsh mouse
furvus group
Peromyscus furvus - blackish deer mouse
Peromyscus latirostris - Wide-rostrum deer mouse
megalops group
Peromyscus megalops - brown deer mouse
Peromyscus melanocarpus - Zempoaltepec
Peromyscus melanurus - black-tailed mouse
mexicanus group
Peromyscus bakeri - Baker's deer mouse
Peromyscus carolpattonae - Carol Patton's deer-mouse
Peromyscus gardneri - Gardner's deer-mouse
Peromyscus grandis - big deer mouse
Peromyscus guatemalensis - Guatemalan deer mouse
Peromyscus gymnotis - naked-eared deer mouse
Peromyscus mayensis - Maya mouse
Peromyscus mexicanus - Mexican deer mouse
Peromyscus nicaraguae - Nicaraguan deer mouse
Peromyscus nudipes - Talamancan deer mouse
Peromyscus salvadorensis - Salvadoran deer mouse
Peromyscus stirtoni - Stirton's deer mouse
Peromyscus tropicalis - Chimoxan deer mouse
Peromyscus yucatanicus - Yucatán deer mouse
Peromyscus zarhynchus - Chiapan deer mouse
Genus Podomys
Podomys floridanus - Florida mouse
Genus Reithrodontomys
Reithrodontomys bakeri - Guerrero harvest mouse
Reithrodontomys brevirostris - short-nosed harvest mouse
Reithrodontomys burti - Sonoran harvest mouse
Reithrodontomys chrysopsis - volcano harvest mouse
Reithrodontomys creper - Chiriqui harvest mouse
Reithrodontomys darienensis - Darien harvest mouse
Reithrodontomys fulvescens - fulvous harvest mouse
Reithrodontomys gracilis - slender harvest mouse
Reithrodontomys hirsutus - hairy harvest mouse
Reithrodontomys humulis - eastern harvest mouse
Reithrodontomys megalotis - western harvest mouse
Reithrodontomys mexicanus - Mexican harvest mouse
Reithrodontomys microdon - small-toothed harvest mouse
Reithrodontomys montanus - plains harvest mouse
Reithrodontomys musseri - Small harvest mouse
Reithrodontomys paradoxus - Nicaraguan harvest mouse
Reithrodontomys raviventris - saltmarsh harvest mouse
Reithrodontomys rodriguezi - Rodriguez's harvest mouse
Reithrodontomys spectabilis - Cozumel harvest mouse
Reithrodontomys sumichrasti - Sumichrast's harvest mouse
Reithrodontomys tenuirostris - narrow-nosed harvest mouse
Reithrodontomys zacatecae - Zacatecas harvest mouse
Genus Scotinomys
Scotinomys teguina - Alston's brown mouse
Scotinomys xerampelinus - Chiriqui brown mouse
Genus Xenomys
Xenomys nelsoni - Magdalena rat

Subfamily Sigmodontinae

Genus Delomys
Delomys collinus - montane delomys
Delomys dorsalis - striped Atlantic forest rat
Delomys sublineatus - pallid Atlantic forest rat
Genus Irenomys
Irenomys tarsalis - Chilean climbing mouse
Genus Juliomys
Juliomys anoblepas (extinct)
Juliomys ossitenuis - Delicate red-nosed tree mouse
Juliomys pictipes - Contreras' juliomys
Juliomys rimofrons - cleft-headed juliomys
Juliomys ximenezi - Aracuaria Forest tree mouse
Genus Phaenomys
Phaenomys ferrugineus - Rio de Janeiro arboreal rat
Genus Punomys
Punomys kofordi - eastern puna mouse
Punomys lemminus - puna mouse
Genus Wiedomys
Wiedomys cerradensis - Cerrado red-nosed mouse
Wiedomys pyrrhorhinos - red-nosed mouse
Genus Wilfredomys
Wilfredomys oenax - greater Wilfred's mouse

Tribe Abrotrichini
Genus Abrothrix
Abrothrix andinus - Andean akodont
Abrothrix hershkovitzi - Hershkovitz's akodont
Abrothrix hirta - Hairy soft-haired mouse
Abrothrix illuteus - gray akodont
Abrothrix jelskii - ornate akodont
Abrothrix lanosus - woolly akodont
Abrothrix longipilis - long-haired akodont
Abrothrix manni - Mann's soft-haired mouse
Abrothrix olivaceus - Manso grass mouse
Abrothrix olivaceus markhami - Wellington akodont
Abrothrix sanborni - Sanborn's akodont
Abrothrix xanthorhina 
Genus Chelemys
Chelemys delfini - Magellanic long-clawed akodont
Chelemys macronyx - Andean long-clawed mouse
Chelemys megalonyx - large long-clawed mouse
Genus Geoxus
Geoxus annectens - Pearson's long-clawed akodont
Geoxus valdivianus - long-clawed mole mouse
Genus Notiomys
Notiomys edwardsii - Edward's long-clawed mouse

Tribe Akodontini
Genus Akodon
Akodon aerosus - Yungas akodont
Akodon affinis - Cordillera Occidental akodont
Akodon albiventer - white-bellied akodont
Akodon azarae - Azara's akodont
Akodon boliviensis - Bolivian akodont
Akodon budini - Budin's akodont
Akodon caenosus- unicolored grass mouse
Akodon cursor - cursorial akodont
Akodon dayi - dusky akodont
Akodon dolores - Córdoba akodont
Akodon fumeus - smoky akodont
Akodon glaucinus 
Akodon iniscatus - Patagonian akodont
Akodon juninensis - Junín akodont
Akodon kofordi - Koford's akodont
Akodon lindberghi - Lindbergh's akodont
Akodon lutescens - Altiplano akodont
Akodon mimus - hocicudo-like akodont
Akodon molinae - Molina's grass mouse
Akodon mollis - soft-furred akodont
Akodon montensis - montane akodont
Akodon mystax - Caparaó akodont
Akodon neocenus - Neuquén akodont
Akodon orophilus - Utcubamba akodont
Akodon paranaensis - Paraná akodont
Akodon pervalens - Tarija akodont
Akodon philipmyersi - Philip Myers' akodont
Akodon polopi - Polop's grass mouse
Akodon reigi - Reig's akodont
Akodon sanctipaulensis - São Paulo akodont
Akodon serrensis - Serra do Mar akodont
Akodon siberiae - Cochabamba akodont
Akodon simulator - white-throated akodont
Akodon spegazzinii - Spegazzini's akodont
Akodon subfuscus - Puno akodont
Akodon surdus - slate-bellied akodont
Akodon sylvanus - woodland akodont
Akodon tartareus
Akodon toba - Toba akodont
Akodon torques - cloud forest grass akodont
Akodon varius - variable akodont
Genus Bibimys
Bibimys chacoensis - Chaco crimson-nosed rat
Bibimys labiosus - large-lipped crimson-nosed rat
Bibimys torresi - Torres' crimson-nosed rat
Genus Blarinomys
Blarinomys breviceps - Brazilian shrew-mouse
Genus Brucepattersonius
Brucepattersonius albinasus? - white-nosed brucie
Brucepattersonius griserufescens - gray-bellied brucie
Brucepattersonius guarani - Guaraní brucie
Brucepattersonius igniventris - red-bellied brucie
Brucepattersonius iheringi - Ihering's hocicudo
Brucepattersonius misionensis - Misiones brucie
Brucepattersonius paradisus - Arroyo of Paradise brucie
Brucepattersonius soricinus - Soricine brucie
Genus Deltamys
Deltamys kempi - Kemp's akodont
Genus Gyldenstolpia
Gyldenstolpia fronto - fossorial giant rat
Gyldenstolpia planaltensis - Cerrado giant rat
Genus Juscelinomys
Juscelinomys candango - Brasilia burrowing mouse or candango mouse (extinct)
Juscelinomys guaporensis - Rio Guapore burrowing mouse
Juscelinomys huanchacae - Huanchaca akodont
Juscelinomys talpinus - molelike mouse
Genus Kunsia
Kunsia tomentosus - woolly giant rat
Genus Lenoxus
Lenoxus apicalis - Andean rat
Genus Necromys
Necromys amoenus - pleasant bolo mouse
Necromys benefactus - Argentine bolo mouse
Necromys lactens - rufous-bellied bolo mouse
Necromys lasiurus - hairy-tailed bolo mouse
Necromys lenguarum - Paraguayan bolo mouse
Necromys obscurus - dark bolo mouse
Necromys punctulatus - spotted bolo mouse
Necromys temchuki - Temchuk's bolo mouse
Necromys urichi - northern grass mouse
Genus Neomicroxus
Neomicroxus bogotensis - Bogotá akodont
Neomicroxus latebricola - Ecuadorian akodont
Genus Oxymycterus
Oxymycterus akodontius - Argentine hocicudo
Oxymycterus amazonicus - Amazon hocicudo
Oxymycterus angularis - angular hocicudo
Oxymycterus caparaoe - Caparao hocicudo
Oxymycterus dasytrichus - Atlantic Forest hocicudo
Oxymycterus delator - spy hocicudo
Oxymycterus hiska - small hocicudo
Oxymycterus hispidus - hispid hocicudo
Oxymycterus hucucha - Quechuan hocicudo
Oxymycterus inca - Incan hocicudo
Oxymycterus itapeby - Itapevi hocicudo rat
Oxymycterus josei - Jose's hocicudo
Oxymycterus nasutus - long-nosed hocicudo
Oxymycterus paramensis - paramo hocicudo
Oxymycterus quaestor - Quaestor hocicudo
Oxymycterus roberti - Robert's hocicudo
Oxymycterus rufus - red hocicudo
Oxymycterus wayku - Ravine hocicudo
Genus Podoxymys
Podoxymys roraimae - Roraima mouse
Genus Scapteromys
Scapteromys aquaticus - Argentine swamp rat
Scapteromys meridionalis - Plateau swamp rat
Scapteromys tumidus - swamp rat
Genus Thalpomys
Thalpomys cerradensis - cerrado mouse
Thalpomys lasiotis - hairy-eared cerrado mouse
Genus Thaptomys
Thaptomys nigrita - blackish grass mouse

Tribe Ichthyomyini
Genus Anotomys
Anotomys leander - Ecuador fish-eating rat
Genus Chibchanomys
Chibchanomys orcesi - Las Cajas ichthyomyine
Chibchanomys trichotis - Chibchan water mouse
Genus Ichthyomys
Ichthyomys hydrobates - crab-eating rat
Ichthyomys pittieri - Pittier's crab-eating rat
Ichthyomys stolzmanni - Stolzmann's crab-eating rat
Ichthyomys tweedii - Tweedy's crab-eating rat
Genus Neusticomys
Neusticomys ferreirai - Ferreira's fish-eating rat
Neusticomys monticolus - montane fish-eating rat
Neusticomys mussoi - Musso's fish-eating rat
Neusticomys oyapocki - Oyapock's fish-eating rat
Neusticomys peruviensis - Peruvian fish-eating rat
Neusticomys venezuelae - Venezuelan fish-eating rat
Neusticomys vossi - Voss's fish-eating rat
Genus Rheomys
Rheomys mexicanus - Mexican water mouse
Rheomys raptor - Goldman's water mouse
Rheomys thomasi - Thomas's water mouse
Rheomys underwoodi - Underwood's water mouse

Tribe Oryzomyini
Genus Aegialomys
Aegialomys galapagoensis - Galápagos rice rat
Aegialomys xanthaeolus - Yellowish rice rat
Genus Amphinectomys
Amphinectomys savamis - Ucayali water rat
Genus Cerradomys
Cerradomys akroai - Akroa rice rat
Cerradomys goytaca - Goytaca rice rat
Cerradomys langguthi - Langguth's rice rat
Cerradomys maracajuensis - Maracaju oryzomys
Cerradomys marinhus - Marinho's rice rat
Cerradomys scotti - Lindbergh's oryzomys
Cerradomys subflavus - Flavescent oryzomys
Cerradomys vivoi - Vivo's rice rat
Genus Drymoreomys
Drymoreomys albimaculatus - White-throated montane forest rat
Genus Eremoryzomys
Eremoryzomys polius - gray rice rat
Genus Euryoryzomys
Euryoryzomys emmonsae - Emmons' rice rat
Euryoryzomys lamia - monster rice rat
Euryoryzomys legatus - big-headed rice rat
Euryoryzomys macconnelli - MacConnell's rice rat
Euryoryzomys nitidus - elegant rice rat
Euryoryzomys russatus - russet rice rat
Genus Handleyomys
Handleyomys alfaroi - Alfaro's rice rat
Handleyomys chapmani - Chapman's rice rat
Handleyomys fuscatus - dusky-footed montane mouse
Handleyomys intectus - Colombian rice rat
Handleyomys melanotis - black-eared rice rat
Handleyomys rhabdops - striped rice rat
Handleyomys rostratus - long-nosed rice rat
Handleyomys saturatior - cloud forest rice rat
Genus Holochilus
Holochilus brasiliensis - Brazilian marsh rat
Holochilus chacarius - Chacoan marsh rat
Holochilus nanus - Amazonian marsh rat
Holochilus oxe - Brazilian North-eastern marsh rat
Holochilus sciureus - Cerrado marsh rat
Genus Hylaeamys
Hylaeamys acritus - Bolivian rice rat
Hylaeamys laticeps - Atlantic Forest oryzomys
Hylaeamys megacephalus - Azara's broad-headed oryzomys
Hylaeamys oniscus - sowbug rice rat
Hylaeamys perenensis - western Amazonian oryzomys
Hylaeamys tatei - Tate's oryzomys
Hylaeamys yunganus - Yungas rice rat
Genus Lundomys
Lundomys molitor - Lund's amphibious rat
Genus Megalomys
Megalomys audreyae - Barbuda giant rice-rat (Extinct)
Megalomys curazensis - (Extinct)
Megalomys desmarestii - Desmarest's pilorie (extinct)
Megalomys georginae - Barbados giant rice rat (extinct)
Megalomys luciae - Saint Lucia pilorie (extinct)
Genus Melanomys
Melanomys caliginosus - dusky melanomys
Melanomys robustulus - robust melanomys
Melanomys zunigae - Zuniga's melanomys
Genus Microakodontomys
Microakodontomys transitorius - Transitional colilargo
Genus Microryzomys
Microryzomys altissimus - Páramo colilargo
Microryzomys minutus - montane colilargo
Genus Mindomys
Mindomys hammondi - Hammond's rice rat
Mindomys kutuku - Kutukú rat
Genus Neacomys
Neacomys aletheia - Upper Juruá bristly mouse
Neacomys amoenus - pleasant bristly mouse
Neacomys dubosti - Dubost's bristly mouse
Neacomys elieceri - Eliecer's bristly mouse
Neacomys guianae - Guiana bristly mouse
Neacomys jau - Jaú bristly mouse
Neacomys macedoruizi - Macedo Ruiz's bristly mouse
Neacomys marajoara - Marajó bristly mouse
Neacomys minutus - small bristly mouse
Neacomys musseri - Musser's bristly mouse
Neacomys paracou - Paracou bristly mouse
Neacomys pictus - painted bristly mouse
Neacomys rosalindae - Rosalind's bristly mouse
Neacomys serranensis - Serrano bristly mouse
Neacomys spinosus - large bristly mouse
Neacomys tenuipes - narrow-footed bristly mouse
Neacomys vargasllosai - Vargas Llosa's bristly mouse
Neacomys vossi - Voss's bristly mouse
Neacomys xingu - Xingu bristly mouse
Genus Nectomys
Nectomys apicalis - western Amazonian nectomys
Nectomys magdalenae - Magdalena-Cauca water rat
Nectomys palmipes - Trinidad nectomys
Nectomys rattus - small-footed bristly mouse
Nectomys squamipes - Atlantic Forest nectomys
Genus Nephelomys
Nephelomys albigularis - white-throated oryzomys
Nephelomys auriventer - golden-bellied oryzomys
Nephelomys caracolus - Costa Central oryzomys
Nephelomys childi - Child's rice rat
Nephelomys devius - Talamancan oryzomys
Nephelomys keaysi - Keays's oryzomys
Nephelomys levipes - nimble-footed oryzomys
Nephelomys maculiventer - Santa Marta rice rat
Nephelomys meridensis - Mérida oryzomys 
Nephelomys moerex - gray-bellied rice rat
Nephelomys nimbosus - lesser golden-bellied rice rat
Nephelomys pectoralis - Western Colombian rice rat
Nephelomys pirrensis - Mount Pirre rice rat
Nephelomys ricardopalmai - Ricardo Palma's rice rat
Genus Nesoryzomys
Nesoryzomys darwini - Darwin's nesoryzomys (extinct
Nesoryzomys fernandinae - Fernandina nesoryzomys
Nesoryzomys indefessus - Indefatigable Galápagos mouse (extinct)
Nesoryzomys narboroughi - large Fernandina Galapagos mouse
Nesoryzomys swarthi - Santiago nesoryzomys
Genus Noronhomys
Noronhomys vespuccii - Vespucci's rodent (extinct)
Genus Oecomys
Oecomys auyantepui - north Amazonian arboreal rice rat
Oecomys bicolor -  bicolored arboreal rice rat
Oecomys catherinae - Atlantic Forest oecomys
Oecomys cleberi - Cleber's oecomys
Oecomys concolor - unicolored arboreal rice rat
Oecomys flavicans - yellow arboreal rice rat
Oecomys mamorae - Mamore arboreal rice rat
Oecomys paricola - Brazilian arboreal rice rat
Oecomys phaeotis - dusky arboreal rice rat
Oecomys rex - king arboreal rice rat
Oecomys roberti - Robert's arboreal rice rat
Oecomys rutilus - red arboreal rice rat
Oecomys speciosus - Venezuelan arboreal rice rat
Oecomys superans - foothill arboreal rice rat
Oecomys sydandersoni - Anderson's arboreal rice rat
Oecomys trinitatis - Trinidad arboreal rice rat
Genus Oligoryzomys
Oligoryzomys andinus - Andean colilargo
Oligoryzomys arenalis - sandy colilargo
Oligoryzomys brendae - Brenda's colilargo
Oligoryzomys chacoensis - Chacoan colilargo
Oligoryzomys destructor - destructive pygmy rice rat
Oligoryzomys flavescens - flavescent colilargo
Oligoryzomys fornesi - Fornes' colilargo
Oligoryzomys fulvescens - fulvous colilargo
Oligoryzomys griseolus - grizzled colilargo
Oligoryzomys longicaudatus - long-tailed colilargo
Oligoryzomys magellanicus - Magellanic pygmy rice rat
Oligoryzomys microtis - small-eared pygmy rice rat
Oligoryzomys moojeni - Moojen's pygmy rice rat
Oligoryzomys nigripes - black-footed colilargo
Oligoryzomys rupestris - Highlands pygmy rice rat
Oligoryzomys stramineus - straw-colored pygmy rice rat
Oligoryzomys transitorius - Synonym of Microakodontomys transitorius ?
Oligoryzomys vegetus - sprightly colilargo
Oligoryzomys victus - St. Vincent pygmy rice rat (extinct)
Genus Oreoryzomys
Oreoryzomys balneator - Peruvian rice rat
Genus Oryzomys
Oryzomys albiventer - white-bellied marsh rice rat
Oryzomys antillarum - Jamaican rice rat (extinct)
Oryzomys couesi - Coues's rice rat
Oryzomys dimidiatus - Thomas's rice rat
Oryzomys gorgasi - Gorgas's rice rat
Oryzomys nelsoni - Tres Marias rice rat (extinct)
Oryzomys palustris - marsh rice rat
Oryzomys peninsulae? - Lower California rice rat (extinct)
Genus Pseudoryzomys
Pseudoryzomys simplex - false oryzomys
Genus Scolomys
Scolomys melanops - short-nosed scolomys
Scolomys ucayalensis - Ucayali spiny mouse
Genus Sigmodontomys
Sigmodontomys alfari - Alfaro's rice water rat
Genus Sooretamys
Sooretamys angouya - Paraguayan rice rat
Genus Tanyuromys
Tanyuromys aphrastus - Harris's rice water rat
Tanyuromys thomasleei - Lee's long-tailed montane rat
Genus Transandinomys
Transandinomys bolivaris - long-whiskered rice rat
Transandinomys talamancae - Talamancan rice rat
Genus Zygodontomys
Zygodontomys brevicauda - short-tailed zygodont
Zygodontomys brunneus - brown zygodont

Tribe Phyllotini
Genus Andalgalomys
Andalgalomys olrogi - Olrog's chaco mouse
Andalgalomys pearsoni - Pearson's chaco mouse
Andalgalomys roigi - Roig's pericote
Genus Andinomys
Andinomys edax - Andean mouse
Genus Auliscomys
Auliscomys boliviensis - Bolivian big-eared mouse
Auliscomys pictus - painted big-eared mouse
Auliscomys sublimis - Andean big-eared mouse
Genus Calomys
Calomys boliviae - Bolivian vesper mouse
Calomys callidus - crafty vesper mouse
Calomys callosus - large vesper mouse
Calomys cerqueirai - Cerqueira's vesper mouse
Calomys expulsus - Caatinga vesper mouse
Calomys fecundus - fecund vesper mouse
Calomys hummelincki - Hummelinck's vesper mouse
Calomys laucha - small vesper mouse
Calomys lepidus - Andean vesper mouse
Calomys musculinus - drylands vesper mouse
Calomys sorellus - Peruvian vesper mouse
Calomys tener - delicate vesper mouse
Calomys tocantinsi - Tocantins vesper mouse
Calomys venustus - Córdoba vesper mouse
Genus Chinchillula
Chinchillula sahamae - altiplano chinchilla mouse
Genus Eligmodontia
Eligmodontia hirtipes - hairy-footed gerbil mouse
Eligmodontia moreni - Monte laucha
Eligmodontia morgani - western Patagonian laucha
Eligmodontia puerulus - Altiplano laucha
Eligmodontia typus - eastern Patagonian laucha
Genus Galenomys
Galenomys garleppi - Garlepp's mouse
Genus Graomys
Graomys centralis - central pericote
Graomys domorum - pale leaf-eared mouse
Graomys edithae - Edith's leaf-eared mouse
Graomys griseoflavus - gray leaf-eared mouse
Genus Loxodontomys
Loxodontomys micropus - Southern big-eared mouse
Loxodontomys pikumche - Pikumche pericote
Genus Phyllotis
Phyllotis alisosiensis - Los Alisos leaf-eared mouse
Phyllotis amicus - friendly leaf-eared mouse
Phyllotis andium - Andean leaf-eared mouse
Phyllotis anitae - Anita's leaf-eared mouse
Phyllotis bonariensis - Bonaerense pericote
Phyllotis caprinus - capricorn leaf-eared mouse
Phyllotis darwini - Darwin's leaf-eared mouse
Phyllotis definitus - definitive leaf-eared mouse
Phyllotis gerbillus - gerbilline pericote
Phyllotis haggardi - Haggard's leaf-eared mouse
Phyllotis limatus - Lima pericote
Phyllotis magister - master leaf-eared mouse
Phyllotis osgoodi - Osgood's leaf-eared mouse
Phyllotis osilae - bunchgrass leaf-eared mouse
Phyllotis pearsoni - Pearson's leaf-eared mouse
Phyllotis pehuenche - Pehuenche leaf-eared mouse
Phyllotis wolffsohni - Wolffsohn's leaf-eared mouse
Phyllotis xanthopygus - yellow-rumped leaf-eared mouse
Genus Salinomys
Salinomys delicatus - delicate salt flat mouse
Genus Tapecomys
Tapecomys primus - primordial tapecua

Tribe Reithrodontini
Genus Euneomys
Euneomys chinchilloides - Patagonian chinchilla mouse
Euneomys fossor - burrowing chinchilla mouse
Euneomys mordax - biting chinchilla mouse
Euneomys petersoni - Peterson's chinchilla mouse
Genus Neotomys
Neotomys ebriosus - Andean swamp rat
Genus Reithrodon
Reithrodon auritus - bunny rat
Reithrodon typicus - naked-soled conyrat

Tribe Sigmodontini
Genus Sigmodon
Subgenus Sigmodon
Sigmodon hispidus species group
Sigmodon alleni - Allen's cotton rat
Sigmodon arizonae - Arizona cotton rat
Sigmodon hirsutus - southern cotton rat
Sigmodon hispidus - hispid cotton rat
Sigmodon mascotensis - West Mexican cotton rat
Sigmodon ochrognathus - yellow-nosed cotton rat
Sigmodon planifrons - Miahuatlán cotton rat
Sigmodon toltecus - Toltec cotton rat
Sigmodon zanjonensis - montane cotton rat
Sigmodon fulviventer species group
Sigmodon fulviventer - tawny-bellied cotton rat
Sigmodon inopinatus - Ecuadorian cotton rat
Sigmodon leucotis - white-eared cotton rat
Sigmodon peruanus - Peruvian cotton rat
Subgenus Sigmomys
Sigmodon alstoni - Alston's cotton rat

Tribe Thomasomyini
Genus Abrawayaomys
Abrawayaomys ruschii - Ruschi's rat
Genus Aepeomys
Aepeomys lugens - olive montane mouse
Aepeomys reigi - Reig's aepeomys
Genus Chilomys
Chilomys instans - Colombian forest mouse
Genus Rhagomys
Rhagomys longilingua - long-tongued rhagomys
Rhagomys rufescens - Brazilian arboreal mouse
Genus Rhipidomys
Rhipidomys albujai - Albuja's climbing rat
Rhipidomys austrinus - Southern climbing mouse
Rhipidomys cariri - Cairi climbing mouse
Rhipidomys caucensis - Cauca climbing mouse
Rhipidomys couesi - Coues's climbing mouse
Rhipidomys emiliae - Eastern Amazon climbing mouse
Rhipidomys fulviventer - Buff-bellied climbing mouse
Rhipidomys gardneri - Gardner's climbing mouse
Rhipidomys ipukensis - Ipuca climbing rat
Rhipidomys itoan - Sky climbing rat
Rhipidomys latimanus - Broad-footed climbing mouse
Rhipidomys leucodactylus - White-footed climbing mouse
Rhipidomys macconnelli - MacConnell's climbing mouse
Rhipidomys macrurus - Cerrado climbing mouse
Rhipidomys mastacalis - Atlantic Forest climbing mouse
Rhipidomys modicus - Peruvian climbing mouse
Rhipidomys nitela - Splendid climbing mouse
Rhipidomys ochrogaster - Yellow-bellied climbing mouse
Rhipidomys similis - Greater Colombian climbing rat
Rhipidomys tenuicauda - Turimiquire climbing rat
Rhipidomys tribei - Tribe's climbing rat
Rhipidomys venezuelae - Venezuelan climbing mouse
Rhipidomys venustus - Charming climbing mouse
Rhipidomys wetzeli - Wetzel's climbing mouse
Genus Thomasomys
Thomasomys andersoni - Anderson's Oldfield mouse
Thomasomys antoniobracki - Antonio Brack's Oldfield mouse
Thomasomys apeco - Apeco Oldfield mouse
Thomasomys aureus - golden Oldfield mouse
Thomasomys baeops - beady-eyed mouse
Thomasomys bombycinus - silky Oldfield mouse
Thomasomys burneoi - Burneo's Oldfield mouse
Thomasomys caudivarius - white-tipped Oldfield mouse
Thomasomys cinereiventer - ashy-bellied Oldfield mouse
Thomasomys cinereus - ash-colored Oldfield mouse
Thomasomys cinnameus - cinnamon-colored Oldfield mouse
Thomasomys daphne - Daphne's Oldfield mouse
Thomasomys eleusis - Peruvian Oldfield mouse
Thomasomys erro - wandering Oldfield mouse
Thomasomys gracilis - slender Oldfield mouse
Thomasomys hudsoni - Hudson's Oldfield mouse
Thomasomys hylophilus - woodland Oldfield mouse
Thomasomys incanus - Inca Oldfield mouse
Thomasomys ischyrus - long-tailed Oldfield mouse
Thomasomys kalinowskii - Kalinowski's Oldfield mouse
Thomasomys ladewi - Ladew's Oldfield mouse
Thomasomys laniger - soft-furred Oldfield mouse
Thomasomys macrotis - large-eared Oldfield mouse
Thomasomys monochromos - unicolored Oldfield mouse
Thomasomys niveipes - snow-footed Oldfield mouse
Thomasomys notatus - distinguished Oldfield mouse
Thomasomys onkiro - Ashaninka Oldfield mouse
Thomasomys oreas - montane Oldfield mouse
Thomasomys paramorum - paramo Oldfield mouse
Thomasomys pardignasi - Pardiñas's Oldfield mouse
Thomasomys popayanus - Popayán Oldfield mouse
Thomasomys praetor - Cajamarca Oldfield mouse
Thomasomys pyrrhonotus - Thomas's Oldfield mouse
Thomasomys rhoadsi - Rhoads's Oldfield mouse
Thomasomys rosalinda - Rosalinda's Oldfield mouse
Thomasomys silvestris - forest Oldfield mouse
Thomasomys taczanowskii - Taczanowski's Oldfield mouse
Thomasomys ucucha - ucucha thomasomys
Thomasomys vestitus - dressy Oldfield mouse
Thomasomys vulcani - Pichincha thomasomys

Family Muridae

Subfamily Leimacomyinae
Genus Leimacomys
Leimacomys buettneri - Togo mouse, Büttner's African forest mouse, groove-toothed forest mouse

Subfamily Deomyinae
Genus Acomys
Acomys airensis - western Saharan spiny mouse
Acomys cahirinus - Cairo spiny mouse
Acomys chudeaui - Chudeau's spiny mouse
Acomys cilicicus - Asia Minor spiny mouse
Acomys cineraceus - grey spiny mouse
Acomys dimidiatus - Eastern spiny mouse
Acomys ignitus - fiery spiny mouse
Acomys johannis - Johan's spiny mouse
Acomys kempi - Kemp's spiny mouse
Acomys louisae - Louise's spiny mouse
Acomys minous - Crete spiny mouse
Acomys mullah - mullah spiny mouse
Acomys muzei - Muze spiny mouse
Acomys nesiotes - Cyprus spiny mouse
Acomys ngurui - Nguru spiny mouse
Acomys percivali - Percival's spiny mouse
Acomys russatus - golden spiny mouse
Acomys seurati - Seurat's spiny mouse
Acomys spinosissimus - spiny mouse
Acomys subspinosus - Cape spiny mouse
Acomys wilsoni - Wilson's spiny mouse
Genus Deomys
Deomys ferugineus - link rat
Genus Lophuromys
Lophuromys angolensis - Angolan brush-furred rat
Lophuromys ansorgei - Ansorge's brush-furred mouse
Lophuromys aquilus - Gray brush-furred rat
Lophuromys brevicaudus - Short-tailed brush-furred rat
Lophuromys brunneus - Thomas's Ethiopian brush-furred rat
Lophuromys chercherensis - Mount Chercher brush-furred rat
Lophuromys chrysopus - Ethiopian forest brush-furred rat
Lophuromys cinereus?
Lophuromys dieterleni - Dieterlen's brush-furred mouse
Lophuromys dudui - Dudu's brush-furred rat
Lophuromys eisentrauti - Mount Lefo brush-furred mouse
Lophuromys flavopunctatus - Yellow-spotted brush-furred rat
Lophuromys huttereri - Hutterer's brush-furred mouse
Lophuromys kilonzoi - Kilonzo's brush-furred rat
Lophuromys laticeps - Albertine Rift brush-furred rat
Lophuromys luteogaster - Yellow-bellied brush-furred rat
Lophuromys machangui - Machandu's brush-furred rat
Lophuromys makundii - Makundi's brush-furred rat
Lophuromys margarettae - Margaret's brush-furred rat
Lophuromys medicaudatus - Medium-tailed brush-furred rat
Lophuromys melanonyx - Black-clawed brush-furred rat
Lophuromys menageshae - North Western Rift brush-furred rat
Lophuromys nudicaudus - Fire-bellied brush-furred rat
Lophuromys pseudosikapusi - Sheko Forest brush-furred rat
Lophuromys rahmi - Rahm's brush-furred rat
Lophuromys rita - Congolese brush-furred rat
Lophuromys roseveari - Mount Cameroon brush-furred rat
Lophuromys sabunii - Sabuni's brush-furred rat
Lophuromys sikapusi - Rusty-bellied brush-furred rat
Lophuromys simensis - Simien brush-furred rat
Lophuromys stanleyi - Stanley's brush-furred rat
Lophuromys verhageni - Verhagen's brush-furred rat
Lophuromys woosnami - Woosnam's brush-furred rat
Lophuromys zena - Zena's brush-furred rat
Genus Uranomys
Uranomys ruddi - Rudd's mouse or the white-bellied brush-furred rat

Subfamily Otomyinae
Genus Myotomys
Myotomys sloggetti - rock karroo rat
Myotomys unisulcatus - bush karroo rat
Genus Otomys
Otomys anchietae - Angolan vlei rat
Otomys angoniensis - Angoni vlei rat
Otomys barbouri - Barbour's vlei rat
Otomys burtoni - Burton's vlei rat
Otomys cheesmani - Cheesman's vlei rat
Otomys cuanzensis - Cuanza vlei rat
Otomys dartmouthi - Ruwenzori vlei rat
Otomys denti - Dent's vlei rat
Otomys dollmani - Dollman's vlei rat
Otomys fortior - Charada vlei rat
Otomys helleri - Heller's vlei rat
Otomys irroratus - vlei rat
Otomys jacksoni - Mount Elgon vlei rat
Otomys lacustris - Tanzanian vlei rat
Otomys laminatus - laminate vlei rat
Otomys maximus - large vlei rat
Otomys occidentalis - western vlei rat
Otomys orestes - Afroalpine vlei rat
Otomys saundersiae - Saunders's vlei rat
Otomys simiensis - Simien vlei rat
Otomys thomasi - Thomas's vlei rat
Otomys tropicalis - tropical vlei rat
Otomys typus - typical vlei rat
Otomys uzungwensis - Uzungwe vlei rat
Otomys yaldeni - Yalden's vlei rat
Otomys zinki - Mount Kilimanjaro vlei rat
Genus Parotomys

Parotomys brantsii - Brants's whistling rat
Parotomys littledalei - Littledale's whistling rat

Subfamily Gerbillinae
Genus Ammodillus
Ammodillus imbellis - ammodile
Genus Brachiones
Brachiones przewalskii - Przewalski's gerbil
Genus Desmodilliscus
Desmodilliscus braueri - pouched gerbil
Genus Desmodillus
Desmodillus auricularis - Cape short-eared gerbil
Genus Dipodillus
Dipodillus bottai - Botta's dipodil
Dipodillus campestris - North African dipodil
Dipodillus dasyurus - Wagner's dipodil
Dipodillus harwoodi - Harwood's dipodil
Dipodillus jamesi - James's dipodil
Dipodillus lowei - Lowe's dipodil
Dipodillus mackilligini - Mackilligin's dipodil
Dipodillus maghrebi - Maghreb dipodil
Dipodillus rupicola - rupicolous dipodil
Dipodillus simoni - Simon's dipodil
Dipodillus somalicus - Somalian dipodil
Dipodillus stigmonyx - Khartoum dipodil
Dipodillus zakariai - Kerkennah Islands dipodil
Genus Gerbilliscus
Gerbilliscus afra - Cape gerbil
Gerbilliscus boehmi - Boehm's gerbil
Gerbilliscus brantsii - highveld gerbil
Gerbilliscus guineae - Guinean gerbil
Gerbilliscus inclusus - Gorongoza gerbil
Gerbilliscus kempi - northern savanna gerbil
Gerbilliscus leucogaster - bushveld gerbil
Gerbilliscus nigricaudus - black-tailed gerbil
Gerbilliscus phillipsi - Phillips's gerbil
Gerbilliscus robustus - fringe-tailed gerbil
Gerbilliscus validus - southern savanna gerbil
Genus Gerbillurus
Gerbillurus paeba - hairy-footed gerbil
Gerbillurus setzeri - Setzer's hairy-footed gerbil
Gerbillurus tytonis - dune hairy-footed gerbil
Gerbillurus vallinus - bushy-tailed hairy-footed gerbil
Genus Gerbillus
Subgenus Handecapleura
Gerbillus amoenus - Pleasant gerbil
Gerbillus brockmani - Brockman's gerbil
Gerbillus diminutus?
Gerbillus famulus - Black-tufted gerbil
Gerbillus garamantis - Algerian gerbil
Gerbillus grobbeni - Grobben's gerbil
Gerbillus henleyi - Pygmy gerbil
Gerbillus juliani?
Gerbillus mauritaniae - Mauritanian gerbil
Gerbillus mesopotamiae - Harrison's gerbil
Gerbillus muriculus - Darfur gerbil
Gerbillus nanus - Balochistan gerbil
Gerbillus percivali?
Gerbillus poecillops - Large Aden gerbil
Gerbillus principulus - Principal gerbil
Gerbillus pusillus - Least gerbil
Gerbillus quadrimaculatus? 
Gerbillus ruberrimus?
Gerbillus syrticus - Sand gerbil
Gerbillus watersi - Waters's gerbil
Subgenus Gerbillus
Gerbillus acticola - Berbera gerbil
Gerbillus agag - Agag gerbil
Gerbillus allenbyi?
Gerbillus andersoni - Anderson's gerbil
Gerbillus aquilus - Swarthy gerbil
Gerbillus bilensis?
Gerbillus bonhotei?
Gerbillus burtoni - Burton's gerbil
Gerbillus cheesmani - Cheesman's gerbil
Gerbillus cosensi?
Gerbillus dalloni?
Gerbillus dongolanus - Dongola gerbil
Gerbillus dunni - Dunn's gerbil
Gerbillus floweri - Flower's gerbil
Gerbillus gerbillus - Lesser Egyptian gerbil
Gerbillus gleadowi - Indian hairy-footed gerbil
Gerbillus hesperinus - Western gerbil
Gerbillus hoogstraali - Hoogstraal's gerbil
Gerbillus latastei - Lataste's gerbil
Gerbillus nancillus - Sudan gerbil
Gerbillus nigeriae - Nigerian gerbil
Gerbillus occiduus - Occidental gerbil
Gerbillus perpallidus - Pale gerbil
Gerbillus pulvinatus - Cushioned gerbil 
Gerbillus pyramidum - Greater Egyptian gerbil
Gerbillus riggenbachi?
Gerbillus rosalinda - Rosalinda gerbil
Gerbillus tarabuli - Tarabul's gerbil
Genus Meriones
Subgenus Meriones
Meriones tamariscinus - Tamarisk jird
Subgenus Parameriones
Meriones persicus - Persian jird
Meriones rex - king jird
Subgenus Pallasiomys
Meriones arimalius - Arabian jird
Meriones chengi - Cheng's jird
Meriones crassus - Sundevall's jird
Meriones dahli - Dahl's jird
Meriones grandis - Moroccan jird
Meriones libycus - Libyan jird
Meriones meridianus - midday jird
Meriones sacramenti - Buxton's jird
Meriones shawi - Shaw's jird
Meriones tristrami - Tristram's jird
Meriones unguiculatus - Mongolian jird
Meriones vinogradovi - Vinogradov's jird
Meriones zarudnyi - Zarudny's jird
Subgenus Cheliones
Meriones hurrianae - Indian desert jird
Genus Microdillus
Microdillus peeli - Somali pygmy gerbil
Genus Pachyuromys
Pachyuromys duprasi - fat-tailed gerbil or duprasi gerbil
Genus Psammomys
Psammomys obesus - fat sand rat
Psammomys vexillaris - thin sand rat
Genus Rhombomys
Rhombomys opimus - great gerbil
Genus Sekeetamys
Sekeetamys calurus - bushy-tailed jird
Genus Tatera
Tatera indica - Indian gerbil
Genus Taterillus
Taterillus arenarius - Sahel gerbil
Taterillus congicus - Congo gerbil
Taterillus emini - Emin's gerbil
Taterillus gracilis - slender gerbil
Taterillus harringtoni - Harrington's gerbil
Taterillus lacustris - Lake Chad gerbil
Taterillus petteri - Petter's gerbil
Taterillus pygargus - Senegal gerbil
Taterillus tranieri - Tranieri's tateril

Subfamily Murinae
Genus Abditomys
Abditomys latidens - Luzon broad-toothed rat
Genus Abeomelomys
Abeomelomys sevia - Papuan abeomelomys
Genus Aethomys
Aethomys bocagei - Bocage's rock rat
Aethomys chrysophilus - red rock rat
Aethomys granti - Grant's rock rat
Aethomys hindei - Hinde's rock rat
Aethomys ineptus - Tete veld aethomys
Aethomys kaiseri - Kaiser's rock rat
Aethomys namaquensis - Namaqua rock rat
Aethomys nyikae - Nyika rock rat
Aethomys silindensis - Silinda rock rat
Aethomys stannarius - Tinfield's rock rat
Aethomys thomasi - Thomas's rock rat
Genus Anisomys
Anisomys imitator - squirrel-toothed rat
Genus Anonymomys
Anonymomys mindorensis - Mindoro rat
Genus Apodemus
Apodemus agrarius - striped field mouse
Apodemus alpicola - alpine field mouse
Apodemus argenteus - small Japanese field mouse
Apodemus arianus? - Persian field mouse
Apodemus avicennicus - Persian wood mouse
Apodemus chevrieri - Chevrier's field mouse
Apodemus draco - South China field mouse
Apodemus epimelas - Western broad-toothed field mouse
Apodemus flavicollis - yellow-necked mouse
Apodemus fulvipectus? - yellow-breasted mouse
Apodemus gurkha - Himalayan field mouse
Apodemus hermonensis? - Mount Hermon field mouse
Apodemus hyrcanicus - Caucasus field mouse
Apodemus latronum - Sichuan field mouse
Apodemus mystacinus - broad-toothed field mouse
Apodemus pallipes - Ward's field mouse
Apodemus peninsulae - Korean field mouse
Apodemus ponticus - Black Sea field mouse
Apodemus rusiges - Kashmir field mouse
Apodemus semotus - Taiwan field mouse
Apodemus speciosus - large Japanese field mouse
Apodemus sylvaticus - wood mouse
Apodemus uralensis - Ural field mouse
Apodemus witherbyi - Steppe field mouse
Genus Apomys
Apomys abrae - Luzon Cordillera forest mouse
Apomys aurorae - Luzon Aurora forest mouse
Apomys banahao - Mount Banahaw forest mouse
Apomys brownorum - Mount Tapulao forest mouse
Apomys camiguinensis - Camiguin forest mouse
Apomys datae - Luzon montane forest mouse
Apomys gracilirostris - Large Mindoro forest mouse
Apomys hylocoetes - Mount Apo forest mouse
Apomys insignis - Mindanao montane forest mouse
Apomys iridensis - Mount Irid forest mouse
Apomys littoralis - Mindanao lowland forest mouse
Apomys lubangensis - Lubang forest mouse
Apomys magnus - Luzon giant forest mouse
Apomys microdon - Small Luzon forest mouse
Apomys minganensis - Mount Mingan forest mouse
Apomys musculus - Least forest mouse
Apomys sacobianus - Long-nosed Luzon forest mouse
Apomys sierrae - Sierra Madre forest mouse
Apomys zambalensis - Luzon Zambales forest mouse
Genus Archboldomys
Archboldomys luzonensis - Mt. Isarog shrew-mouse
Archboldomys maximus - Large Cordillera shrew-mouse
Genus Arvicanthis
Arvicanthis abyssinicus - Abyssinian grass rat
Arvicanthis ansorgei - Sudanian grass rat
Arvicanthis blicki - Blick's grass rat
Arvicanthis nairobae - Nairobi grass rat
Arvicanthis neumanni - Neumann's grass rat
Arvicanthis niloticus - African grass rat
Arvicanthis rufinus - Guinean grass rat
Genus Baiyankamys
Baiyankamys habbema - mountain water rat
Baiyankamys shawmayeri -  Shaw Mayer's water rat
Genus Bandicota
Bandicota bengalensis - Lesser bandicoot rat
Bandicota indica - Greater bandicoot rat
Bandicota savilei - Savile's bandicoot rat
Genus Batomys
Batomys cagayanensis (extinct)
Batomys dentatus - Large-toothed hairy-tailed rat
Batomys granti - Luzon hairy-tailed rat
Batomys hamiguitan - Luzon hairy-tailed rat
Batomys russatus - Hamiguitan hairy-tailed rat
Batomys salomonseni - Mindanao hairy-tailed rat
Batomys uragon - Mount Isarog hairy-tailed rat
Genus Berylmys
Berylmys berdmorei - Small white-toothed rat
Berylmys bowersi - Bower's white-toothed rat
Berylmys mackenziei - Kenneth's white-toothed rat
Berylmys manipulus - Manipur white-toothed rat
Genus Brassomys
Brassomys albidens - White-toothed brush mouse
Genus Bullimus
Bullimus bagobus - Bagobo rat
Bullimus carletoni - Carleton's forest rat
Bullimus gamay - Camiguin forest rat
Bullimus luzonicus - Large Luzon forest rat
Genus Bunomys
Bunomys andrewsi - Andrew's hill rat
Bunomys chrysocomus - Yellow-haired hill rat
Bunomys coelestis - Heavenly hill rat
Bunomys fratrorum - Fraternal hill rat
Bunomys heinrichi?
Bunomys karokophilus - Karoko hill rat
Bunomys penitus - Inland hill rat
Bunomys prolatus - Long-headed hill rat
Bunomys torajae - Tana Toraja hill rat
Genus Carpomys
Carpomys dakai (extinct)
Carpomys melanurus - short-footed Luzon tree rat
Carpomys phaeurus - white-bellied Luzon tree rat
Genus Chiromyscus
Chiromyscus chiropus - Fea's tree rat
Genus Chiropodomys
 Chiropodomys calamianensis - Palawan pencil-tailed tree mouse
 Chiropodomys gliroides - Indomalayan pencil-tailed tree mouse
 Chiropodomys karlkoopmani - Koopman's pencil-tailed tree mouse
 Chiropodomys major - Large pencil-tailed tree mouse
 Chiropodomys muroides - Gray-bellied pencil-tailed tree mouse
 Chiropodomys pusillus - Small pencil-tailed tree mouse
 Chiropodomys maximus (Extinct)
 Chiropodomys primitivus (Extinct)
Genus Chiruromys
Chiruromys forbesi - Greater tree mouse
Chiruromys lamia - lamia
Chiruromys vates - Lesser tree mouse
Genus Chrotomys
Chrotomys gonzalesi - Isarog shrew-rat
Chrotomys mindorensis - lowland striped shrew-rat
Chrotomys sibuyanensis - Sibuyan striped shrew-rat
Chrotomys silaceus - silver earth rat
Chrotomys whiteheadi - Luzon montane shrew rat
Genus Coccymys
Coccymys kirrhos - Tawny brush mouse
Coccymys ruemmleri - Ruemmler's brush mouse
Coccymys shawmayeri - Central Cordillera brush mouse
Genus Colomys
Colomys goslingi - African water rat
Genus Congomys
Congomys lukolelae - Lukolela swamp rat
Congomys verschureni - Verschuren's swamp rat
Genus Conilurus
Conilurus albipes - white-footed rabbit rat (extinct)
Conilurus capricornensis - Capricorn rabbit rat (extinct)
Conilurus penicillatus - brush-tailed rabbit rat
Genus Coryphomys
Coryphomys buehleri - Buehler's rat (extinct)
Coryphomys musseri - Timor giant rat (extinct)
Genus Crateromys
Crateromys australis - Dinagat bushy-tailed cloud rat
Crateromys ballik (extinct)
Crateromys heaneyi - Panay crateromys
Crateromys paulus - Ilin bushy-tailed cloud rat
Crateromys schadenbergi - Luzon bushy-tailed cloud rat
Genus Cremnomys
Cremnomys cutchicus - Cutch rat
Cremnomys elvira - Elvira rat
Genus Crossomys
Crossomys moncktoni - earless water rat
Genus Crunomys
Crunomys celebensis - Celebes shrew rat
Crunomys fallax - northern Luzon shrew rat
Crunomys melanius - Leyte shrew rat
Crunomys suncoides - Katanglad shrew mouse
Genus Dacnomys
Dacnomys millardi - Millard's rat
Genus Dasymys
Dasymys alleni - Glover Allen's dasymys
Dasymys cabrali - Crawford-Cabral's dasymys
Dasymys foxi - Fox's shaggy rat
Dasymys incomtus - African marsh rat
Dasymys montanus - montane shaggy rat
Dasymys nudipes - Angolan marsh rat
Dasymys robertsii - Robert's shaggy rat
Dasymys rufulus - West African shaggy rat
Dasymys rwandae - Rwandan dasymys
Dasymys shortridgei
Dasymys sua - Tanzanian dasymys
Genus Dephomys
Dephomys defua - defua rat
Dephomys eburneae - Ivory Coast dephomys
Genus Desmomys
Desmomys harringtoni - Harrington's rat
Desmomys yaldeni - Yalden's desmomys
Genus Diomys
Diomys crumpi - Crump's mouse
Genus Diplothrix
Diplothrix legata - Ryukyu Islands tree rat
Diplothrix yangziensis (extinct)
Genus Echiothrix
Echiothrix centrosa - Central Sulawesi echiothrix
Echiothrix leucura - Sulawesi spiny rat
Genus Eropeplus
Eropeplus canus - Sulawesi soft-furred rat
Genus Golunda
Golunda aouraghei (extinct)
Golunda dulamensis (extinct)
Golunda ellioti - Indian bush rat
Golunda gurai (extinct)
Golunda jaegeri (extinct)
Golunda kelleri (extinct)
Golunda tatroticus (extinct)
Genus Grammomys
Grammomys aridulus - arid thicket rat
Grammomys brevirostris - short-snouted thicket rat
Grammomys buntingi - Bunting's thicket rat
Grammomys caniceps - gray-headed thicket rat
Grammomys cometes - Mozambique thicket rat
Grammomys dolichurus - woodland thicket rat
Grammomys dryas - forest thicket rat
Grammomys gigas - giant thicket rat
Grammomys ibeanus - Ruwenzori thicket rat
Grammomys kuru - eastern rainforest grammomys
Grammomys macmillani - Macmillan's thicket rat
Grammomys minnae - Ethiopian thicket rat
Grammomys poensis - western rainforest grammomys
Grammomys selousi - Selous thicket rat
Grammomys surdaster? - African woodland thicket rat
Genus Hadromys
Hadromys humei - Manipur bush rat
Hadromys loujacobsi (extinct)
Hadromys yunnanensis - Yunnan hadromys
Genus Haeromys
Haeromys margarettae - ranee mouse
Haeromys minahassae - Minahassa ranee mouse
Haeromys pusillus - lesser ranee mouse
Genus Hapalomys
Hapalomys delacouri - Delacour's marmoset rat
Hapalomys gracilis (extinct)
Hapalomys longicaudatus - marmoset rat
Hapalomys suntsovi - Suntsov's marmoset rat
Genus Heimyscus
Heimyscus fumosus - African smoky mouse
Genus Hybomys
Hybomys badius - Cameroon highland hybomys
Hybomys basilii - Father Basilio's striped mouse
Hybomys lunaris - moon striped mouse
Hybomys planifrons - Miller's striped mouse
Hybomys trivirgatus - Temminck's striped mouse
Hybomys univittatus - Peter's striped mouse
Genus Hydromys
Hydromys chrysogaster - water rat or rakali
Hydromys hussoni - Western water rat
Hydromys neobrittanicus - New Britain water rat
Hydromys ziegleri - Ziegler's water rat
Genus Hylomyscus
Hylomyscus aeta - beaded wood mouse
Hylomyscus alleni - Allen's wood mouse
Hylomyscus anselli - Ansell's wood mouse
Hylomyscus arcimontensis - Arc Mountain wood mouse
Hylomyscus baeri - Baer's wood mouse
Hylomyscus carillus - Angolan wood mouse
Hylomyscus denniae - montane wood mouse
Hylomyscus endorobae - Mount Kenya wood mouse
Hylomyscus grandis - Mount Oku hylomyscus
Hylomyscus heinrichorum - Heinrich's wood mouse
Hylomyscus kerbispeterhansi - Kerbis Peterhans's wood mouse
Hylomyscus mpungamachagorum - Mahale wood mouse
Hylomyscus pamfi - Dahomey Gap wood mouse
Hylomyscus parvus - little wood mouse
Hylomyscus pygmaeus - Pygmy wood mouse
Hylomyscus simus - Flat-nosed wood mouse
Hylomyscus stanleyi - Stanley's wood mouse
Hylomyscus stella - Stella wood mouse
Hylomyscus thornesmithae - Mother Ellen's wood mouse
Hylomyscus vulcanorum - Albertine Rift wood mouse
Hylomyscus walterverheyeni - Walter Verheyeni's mouse
Genus Hyomys
Hyomys dammermani - Western white-eared giant rat
Hyomys goliath - Eastern white-eared giant rat
Genus Kadarsanomys
Kadarsanomys sodyi - Sody's tree rat
Genus Komodomys
Komodomys rintjanus - Komodo rat
Genus Lamottemys
Lamottemys okuensis - Mt. Oku rat
Genus Leggadina
Leggadina forresti - Forrest's mouse
Leggadina lakedownensis - Lakeland Downs mouse
Genus Lemniscomys
Lemniscomys barbarus - Barbary striped grass mouse
Lemniscomys bellieri - Bellier's striped grass mouse
Lemniscomys griselda - Griselda's striped grass mouse
Lemniscomys hoogstraali - Hoogstral's striped grass mouse
Lemniscomys linulus - Senegal one-striped grass mouse
Lemniscomys macculus - buffoon striped grass mouse
Lemniscomys mittendorfi - Mittendorf's striped grass mouse
Lemniscomys rosalia - single-striped grass mouse
Lemniscomys roseveari - Rosevear's striped grass mouse
Lemniscomys striatus - typical striped grass mouse
Lemniscomys zebra - Heuglin's lemniscomys
Genus Lenomys
Lenomys grovesi - Groves's giant rat (extinct)
Lenomys meyeri - trefoil-toothed giant rat
Genus Lenothrix
Lenothrix canus - gray tree rat
Genus Leopoldamys
Leopoldamys ciliatus - Sundaic mountain leopoldamys
Leopoldamys diwangkarai - Diwangkara's long-tailed giant rat
Leopoldamys edwardsi - Edwards's long-tailed giant rat
Leopoldamys milleti - Millet's leopoldamys
Leopoldamys neilli - Neill's long-tailed giant rat
Leopoldamys sabanus - long-tailed giant rat
Leopoldamys siporanus - Mentawai long-tailed giant rat
Genus Leporillus
Leporillus apicalis - lesser stick-nest rat
Leporillus conditor - greater stick-nest rat
Genus Leptomys
Leptomys arfakensis - Arfak water rat
Leptomys elegans - Long-footed water rat
Leptomys ernstmayri - Ernst Mayr's water rat
Leptomys paulus - Small water rat
Leptomys signatus - Fly River water rat
Genus Limnomys
Limnomys bryophilus - gray-bellied limnomys
Limnomys sibuanus - Mindanao mountain rat
Genus Lorentzimys
Lorentzimys nouhuysi - New Guinean jumping mouse
Genus Macruromys
Macruromys elegans - western small-toothed rat
Macruromys major - eastern small-toothed rat
Genus Madromys
Madromys blanfordi - Blanford's madromys
Genus Malacomys
Malacomys cansdalei - Cansdale's swamp rat
Malacomys edwardsi - Edward's swamp rat
Malacomys longipes - big-eared swamp rat
Genus Mallomys
Mallomys aroaensis - De Vis's woolly rat
Mallomys gunung - alpine woolly rat
Mallomys istapantap - subalpine woolly rat
Mallomys rothschildi - Rothschild's woolly rat
Mallomys sp. nov - Bosavi woolly rat
Mallomys sp. nov - Arfak woolly rat
Mallomys sp. nov - Foja woolly rat
Genus Mammelomys
Mammelomys lanosus - highland mammelomys
Mammelomys rattoides - lowland mammelomys
Genus Margaretamys
 Margaretamys beccarii - Beccari's margareta rat
 Margaretamys christinae - Christine's margareta rat
 Margaretamys elegans - elegant margareta rat
 Margaretamys parvus - little margareta rat
Genus Mastacomys
 Mastacomys fuscus - Broad-toothed mouse
Genus Mastomys
Mastomys angolensis - Angolan multimammate mouse
Mastomys awashensis - Awash mastomys
Mastomys coucha - southern multimammate mouse
Mastomys erythroleucus - Guinea multimammate mouse
Mastomys huberti - Hubert's mastomys
Mastomys kollmannspergeri - Kollmannsperger's mastomys
Mastomys natalensis - Hildebrandt's multimammate mouse
Mastomys shortridgei - Shortridge's multimammate mouse
Genus Maxomys
 Maxomys alticola - Mountain spiny rat
 Maxomys baeodon - small Bornean maxomys
 Maxomys bartelsii - Bartels's spiny rat
 Maxomys dollmani - Dollman's spiny rat
 Maxomys hellwaldii - Hellwald's spiny rat
 Maxomys hylomyoides - Sumatran spiny rat
 Maxomys inas - Malayan mountain spiny rat
 Maxomys inflatus - Fat-nosed spiny rat
 Maxomys moi - Mo's spiny rat
 Maxomys musschenbroekii - Musschenbroek's spiny rat
 Maxomys ochraceiventer - Chestnut-bellied spiny rat
 Maxomys pagensis - Pagai spiny rat
 Maxomys panglima - Palawan spiny rat
 Maxomys rajah - Rajah spiny rat
 Maxomys surifer - Red spiny rat
 Maxomys tajuddinii - Tajuddin's spiny rat
 Maxomys wattsi - Watts's spiny rat
 Maxomys whiteheadi - Whitehead's spiny rat
Genus Melasmothrix
Melasmothrix naso - Sulawesian shrew rat
Genus Melomys
Melomys aerosus - dusky mosaic-tailed rat
Melomys arcium - Rossel Island melomys
Melomys bannisteri - Great Key Island melomys
Melomys bougainville - Bougainville mosaic-tailed rat
Melomys burtoni - grassland mosaic-tailed rat
Melomys capensis - Cape York mosaic-tailed rat
Melomys caurinus - short-tailed Talaud melomys
Melomys cervinipes - fawn-footed mosaic-tailed rat
Melomys cooperae - Yamdena Island melomys
Melomys dollmani - Dollman's melomys
Melomys fraterculus - Manusela mosaic-tailed rat
Melomys frigicola - Snow Mountains grassland melomys
Melomys fulgens - Seram long-tailed melomys
Melomys howi - Riama Island melomys
Melomys leucogaster - white-bellied mosaic-tailed rat
Melomys lutillus - Papua grassland melomys
Melomys matambuai - Manus Island melomys
Melomys obiensis - Obi mosaic-tailed rat
Melomys paveli - Pavel's Seram melomys
Melomys rubicola - Bramble Cay mosaic-tailed rat
Melomys rufescens - black-tailed mosaic-tailed rat
Melomys spechti - Specht's mosaic-tailed rat
Melomys talaudium - long-tailed Talaud melomys
Genus Mesembriomys [incomplete species listing?]
Mesembriomys gouldii - black-footed tree-rat
Mesembriomys macrurus - Golden-backed tree-rat
Genus Microhydromys
Microhydromys musseri - Musser's shrew mouse
Microhydromys richardsoni - groove-toothed shrew mouse
Genus Micromys
 Micromys bendai (extinct)
 Micromys caesaris (extinct)
 Micromys chalceus (extinct)
 Micromys cingulatus (extinct)
 Micromys coronensis (extinct)
 Micromys erythrotis - Indochinese harvest mouse
 Micromys kozaniensis (extinct)
 Micromys liui (extinct)
 Micromys minutus - Eurasian harvest mouse
 Micromys paricioi (extinct)
 Micromys praeminutus (extinct)
 Micromys steffensi (extinct)
Genus Millardia
Millardia gleadowi - sand-colored soft-furred rat
Millardia kathleenae - Miss Ryley's soft-furred rat
Millardia kondana - Kondana soft-furred rat
Millardia meltada - soft-furred rat
Genus Mirzamys
Mirzamys louiseae - Mirza's western moss rat
Mirzamys norahae - Mirza's eastern moss rat
Genus Montemys
Montemys delectorum - delectable soft-furred mouse
Genus Muriculus
Muriculus imberbis - striped-back mouse
Genus Mus
Mus baoulei - Baoule's mouse
Mus booduga - Little Indian field mouse
Mus bufo - Toad mouse     
Mus callewaerti - Callewaert's mouse  
Mus caroli - Ryukyu mouse 
Mus cervicolor - Fawn-coloured mouse 
Mus cookii - Cook's mouse 
Mus crociduroides - Sumatran shrewlike mouse 
Mus cypriacus - Cypriot mouse 
Mus famulus - Servant mouse
Mus fernandoni - Ceylon spiny mouse 
Mus fragilicauda - Sheath-tailed mouse
Mus goundae - Gounda mouse
Mus haussa - Hausa mouse
Mus indutus - desert pygmy mouse 
Mus lepidoides - Little Burmese field mouse
Mus macedonicus - Macedonian mouse
Mus mahomet - Mahomet mouse
Mus mattheyi - Matthey's mouse 
Mus mayori - Mayor's mouse 
Mus minutoides - African pygmy mouse
Mus musculoides - Temminck's mouse 
Mus musculus - House mouse 
Mus musculus domesticus - Western European house mouse
Mus musculus molossinus - Japanese house mouse
Mus neavei - Neave's mouse 
Mus nitidulus - Blyth's mouse
Mus orangiae - Free State pygmy mouse/orange mouse 
Mus oubanguii - Oubangui mouse 
Mus pahari - Gairdner's shrewmouse 
Mus phillipsi - Phillips's mouse 
Mus platythrix - Flat-haired mouse 
Mus saxicola - Rock-loving mouse 
Mus setulosus - Peters's mouse  
Mus setzeri - Setzer's pygmy mouse  
Mus shortridgei - Shortridge's mouse
Mus sorella - Thomas's pygmy mouse 
Mus spicilegus - Mound-building mouse/steppe mouse
Mus spretus - Algerian mouse  
Mus tenellus - Delicate mouse  
Mus terricolor - Earth-coloured mouse 
Mus triton - Gray-bellied pygmy mouse  
Mus vulcani - Volcano mouse     
Genus Musseromys
Musseromys anacuao - Sierra Madre tree-mouse
Musseromys beneficus - Mount Pulag tree-mouse
Musseromys gulantang - Banahaw tree mouse
Musseromys inopinatus - Amuyao tree-mouse
Genus Mylomys
Mylomys dybowskii - African groove-toothed rat
Mylomys rex - Ethiopian mylomys
Genus Myomyscus
Myomyscus verreauxii - Verreaux's white-footed rat
Genus Nesokia
Nesokia bunnii - Bunn's short-tailed bandicoot rat
Nesokia indica - short-tailed bandicoot rat
Genus Nesoromys
Nesoromys ceramicus - Seram Island mountain rat
Genus Nilopegamys
Nilopegamys plumbeus - Ethiopian amphibious rat
Genus Niviventer
Niviventer andersoni - Anderson's white-bellied rat
Niviventer brahma - Brahma white-bellied rat
Niviventer bukit - Bukit white-bellied rat
Niviventer cameroni - Cameron highlands niviventer
Niviventer confucianus - Chinese white-bellied rat
Niviventer coninga - spiny Taiwan niviventer
Niviventer cremoriventer - dark-tailed tree rat
Niviventer culturatus - Oldfield white-bellied rat
Niviventer eha - smoke-bellied rat
Niviventer excelsior - large white-bellied rat
Niviventer fengi - Tibetan white-bellied rat
Niviventer fraternus - montane Sumatran niviventer
Niviventer fulvescens - chestnut white-bellied rat
Niviventer hinpoon - limestone rat
Niviventer huang - South China white-bellied rat
Niviventer langbianis - Lang Bian white-bellied rat
Niviventer lepturus - narrow-tailed white-bellied rat
Niviventer lotipes - Hainan white-bellied rat
Niviventer mekongis - Mekong white-bellied rat
Niviventer niviventer - white-bellied rat
Niviventer rapit - long-tailed mountain rat
Niviventer tenaster - Tenasserim white-bellied rat
Genus Notomys
Notomys alexis - Spinifex hopping mouse
Notomys amplus - Short-tailed hopping mouse (extinct)
Notomys aquilo - Northern hopping mouse
Notomys cervinus - Fawn hopping mouse
Notomys fuscus - Dusky hopping mouse
Notomys longicaudatus - Long-tailed hopping mouse (extinct)
Notomys mitchellii - Mitchell's hopping mouse
Notomys macrotis - Big-eared hopping mouse (extinct)
Notomys mordax - Darling Downs hopping mouse (extinct)
Notomys robustus - Great hopping mouse (extinct)
Genus Ochromyscus
Ochromyscus brockmani - Brockman's rock mouse
Ochromyscus yemeni - Yemeni mouse
Genus Oenomys
Oenomys hypoxanthus - rufous-nosed rat
Oenomys hypoxanthus albiventris
Oenomys ornatus - Ghana rufous-nosed rat
Oenomys tiercelini
Genus Palawanomys
Palawanomys furvus - Palawan soft-furred mountain rat
Genus Papagomys
Papagomys armandvillei - Flores giant rat
Papagomys theodorverhoeveni - Verhoeven's giant tree rat (extinct)
Genus Parahydromys
Parahydromys asper - New Guinea waterside rat
Genus Paraleptomys
Paraleptomys rufilatus - northern water rat
Paraleptomys wilhelmina - short-haired water rat
Genus Paramelomys
Paramelomys gressitti - Gressitt's paramelomys
Paramelomys levipes - Papuan lowland paramelomys
Paramelomys lorentzii - Lorentz's paramelomys
Paramelomys mollis - montane soft-furred paramelomys
Paramelomys moncktoni - Monckton's paramelomys
Paramelomys naso - long-nosed paramelomys
Paramelomys platyops - common lowland paramelomys
Paramelomys rubex - mountain paramelomys
Paramelomys steini - Stein's paramelomys
Genus Paruromys
Paruromys dominator - Sulawesi bear rat
Genus Paulamys
Paulamys naso - Flores long-nosed rat
Genus Pelomys
Pelomys campanae - bell groove-toothed swamp rat
Pelomys fallax - creek groove-toothed swamp rat
Pelomys hopkinsi - Hopkins's groove-toothed swamp rat
Pelomys isseli - Issel's groove-toothed swamp rat
Pelomys minor - least groove-toothed swamp rat
Genus Phloeomys
Phloeomys cumingi - southern Luzon giant cloud rat
Phloeomys pallidus - northern Luzon giant cloud rat
Genus Pithecheir
Pithecheir melanurus - red tree rat
Pithecheir parvus - Malayan tree rat
Genus Pithecheirops
Pithecheirops otion - Bornean pithecheirops
Genus Pogonomelomys
Pogonomelomys brassi - Grey pogonomelomys
Pogonomelomys bruijni - lowland brush mouse
Pogonomelomys mayeri - Shaw Mayer's brush mouse
Genus Pogonomys
Pogonomys championi - Champion's tree mouse
Pogonomys fergussoniensis - D'Entrecasteaux Archipelago pogonomys
Pogonomys loriae - large tree mouse
Pogonomys macrourus - chestnut tree mouse
Pogonomys mollipilosus - Prehensile-tailed rat
Pogonomys sylvestris - gray-bellied tree mouse
Genus Praomys
Praomys coetzeei - Coetzee's soft-furred mouse
Praomys daltoni - Dalton's praomys
Praomys degraaffi - De Graaff's praomys
Praomys derooi - Deroo's praomys
Praomys hartwigi - Hartweg's soft-furred mouse
Praomys jacksoni - Jackson's soft-furred mouse
Praomys minor - least soft-furred mouse
Praomys misonnei - Misonne's soft-furred mouse
Praomys morio - Cameroon soft-furred mouse
Praomys mutoni - Muton's soft-furred mouse
Praomys obscurus - Gotel Mountain praomys
Praomys petteri - Petter's praomys
Praomys rostratus - forest soft-furred mouse
Praomys tullbergi - Tullberg's soft-furred mouse
Genus Protochromys
Protochromys fellowsi - Papuan protochromys
Genus Pseudohydromys
Pseudohydromys berniceae - Bishop's moss mouse
Pseudohydromys carlae - Huon small-toothed moss mouse
Pseudohydromys eleanorae - Laurie's moss mouse
Pseudohydromys ellermani - Shaw Mayer's shrew mouse
Pseudohydromys fuscus - mottled-tailed shrew mouse
Pseudohydromys germani - German's one-toothed moss mouse
Pseudohydromys murinus - eastern shrew mouse
Pseudohydromys musseri - Musser's shrew mouse
Pseudohydromys occidentalis - western shrew mouse
Pseudohydromys patriciae - Woolley's moss mouse
Pseudohydromys pumehanae - Southern small-toothed moss mouse
Pseudohydromys sandrae - White-bellied moss mouse
Genus Pseudomys
Pseudomys albocinereus - Ash-grey mouse
Pseudomys apodemoides - Silky mouse
Pseudomys australis - Plains rat
Pseudomys bolami - Bolam's mouse
Pseudomys calabyi - Kakadu pebble-mound mouse
Pseudomys chapmani - Western pebble-mound mouse
Pseudomys delicatulus - Little native mouse
Pseudomys desertor - Desert mouse
Pseudomys fieldi?
Pseudomys fumeus - Smoky mouse
Pseudomys glaucus - Blue-gray mouse (possibly extinct)
Pseudomys gouldii - Gould's mouse
Pseudomys gracilicaudatus - Eastern chestnut mouse
Pseudomys hermannsburgensis - Sandy inland mouse
Pseudomys higginsi - Long-tailed mouse
Pseudomys johnsoni - Central pebble-mound mouse
Pseudomys laborifex?
Pseudomys nanus - Western chestnut mouse
Pseudomys novaehollandiae - New Holland mouse
Pseudomys occidentalis - Western mouse
Pseudomys oralis - Hastings River mouse
Pseudomys patrius - Country mouse
Pseudomys pilligaensis - Pilliga mouse
Pseudomys praeconis?
Pseudomys shortridgei - Heath mouse
Pseudomys vandycki (extinct)
Genus Rattus
Rattus adustus - Sunburned rat
Rattus andamanensis - Sikkim rat
Rattus arfakiensis - Vogelkop mountain rat
Rattus argentiventer - Ricefield rat
Rattus arrogans - Western New Guinea mountain rat
Rattus baluensis - Summit rat
Rattus blangorum - Aceh rat
Rattus bontanus - Bonthain rat
Rattus burrus - Nonsense rat
Rattus colletti - Dusky rat
Rattus detentus - Manus Island spiny rat
Rattus elaphinus - Sula rat
Rattus enganus - Enggano rat
Rattus everetti - Philippine forest rat
Rattus exulans - Polynesian rat
Rattus facetus - Lore Lindu xanthurus rat
Rattus feliceus - Spiny Ceram rat
Rattus foramineus?
Rattus fuscipes - bush rat
Rattus giluwensis - Giluwe rat
Rattus hainaldi - Hainald's rat
Rattus hoffmanni - Hoffmann's rat
Rattus hoogerwerfi - Hoogerwerf's rat
Rattus jobiensis - Japen rat
Rattus koopmani - Koopman's rat
Rattus korinchi - Korinch's rat
Rattus leucopus - Cape York rat
Rattus losea - Lesser ricefield rat
Rattus lugens - Mentawai rat
Rattus lutreolus - Australian swamp rat
Rattus macleari - Maclear's rat
Rattus marmosurus - Opossum rat
Rattus mindorensis - Mindoro black rat
Rattus mollicomulus - Little soft-furred rat
Rattus montanus - Nillu rat
Rattus mordax - Eastern rat
Rattus morotaiensis - Molaccan prehensile-tailed rat
Rattus nativitatis - bulldog rat, extinct (1903)
Rattus nikenii - Gag Island rat
Rattus niobe - Moss-forest rat
Rattus nitidus - Himalayan field rat
Rattus norvegicus - Brown rat
Rattus novaeguineae - New Guinean rat
Rattus omichlodes - Arianus's rat
Rattus osgoodi - Osgood's rat
Rattus palmarum - Palm rat
Rattus pelurus - Peleng rat
Rattus pococki - Pocock's highland rat
Rattus praetor - Large New Guinea spiny rat
Rattus pyctoris - Turkestan rat
Rattus ranjiniae - Kerala rat
Rattus rattus - Black rat
Rattus richardsoni - Glacier rat
Rattus sakeratensis - little Indochinese field rat
Rattus salocco - Southeastern xanthurus rat
Rattus sanila - New Ireland forest rat
Rattus satarae - Sahyadris forest rat
Rattus sikkimensis?
Rattus simalurensis - Simalur rat
Rattus sordidus - Dusky field rat
Rattus steini - Stein's rat
Rattus stoicus - Andaman rat
Rattus tanezumi - Tanezumi rat
Rattus tawitawiensis - Tawitawi forest rat
Rattus timorensis - Timor rat
Rattus tiomanicus - Malayan field rat
Rattus tunneyi - Pale field rat
Rattus turkestanicus?
Rattus vandeuseni - Van Deusen's rat
Rattus verecundus - Slender rat
Rattus villosissimus - Long-haired rat
Rattus xanthurus - Yellow-tailed rat
Genus Serengetimys
Serengetimys pernanus - dwarf multimammate mouse
Genus Rhabdomys
Rhabdomys dilectus - mesic four-striped grass rat
Rhabdomys pumilio - Four-striped grass mouse
Genus Rhynchomys
Rhynchomys banahao - Banahao shrew-rat
Rhynchomys isarogensis - Isarog shrew-rat
Rhynchomys labo - Labo shrew rat
Rhynchomys mingan - Mingan shrew-rat
Rhynchomys soricoides - Mt. Data shrew-rat
Rhynchomys tapulao - Tapulao shrew-rat
Genus Saxatilomys
Saxatilomys paulinae - Paulina's limestone rat
Genus Solomys
Solomys ponceleti - Poncelet's naked-tailed rat
Solomys salamonis - Florida naked-tailed rat
Solomys salebrosus - Bougainville naked-tailed rat
Solomys sapientis - Isabel naked-tailed rat
Solomys spriggsarum - Buka naked-tailed rat (extinct)
Genus Soricomys
Soricomys kalinga - Kalinga shrew mouse
Soricomys leonardocoi - Leonardo shrew mouse
Soricomys montanus - Southern Cordillera shrew-mouse
Soricomys musseri - Sierra Madre shrew-mouse
Genus Sommeromys
Sommeromys macrorhinos - Sommer's Sulawesi rat
Genus Spelaeomys
Spelaeomys florensis - Flores cave rat
Genus Srilankamys
Srilankamys ohiensis - Ohiya rat
Genus Stenocephalemys
Stenocephalemys albipes - white-footed stenocephalemys
Stenocephalemys albocaudata - Ethiopian narrow-headed rat
Stenocephalemys griseicauda - gray-tailed narrow-headed rat
Stenocephalemys ruppi - Rupp's stenocephalemys
Stenocephalemys sokolovi - Sokolov's Ethiopian rat
Stenocephalemys zimai - Zima's Ethiopian rat
Genus Stochomys
Stochomys longicaudatus - target rat
Genus Sundamys
Sundamys annandalei - Annandale's rat
Sundamys infraluteus - mountain giant rat
Sundamys maxi - Bartels's rat
Sundamys muelleri - Mueller's giant Sunda rat
Genus Taeromys
Taeromys arcuatus - Salokko rat
Taeromys callitrichus - lovely-haired rat
Taeromys celebensis - Celebes rat
Taeromys hamatus - Sulawesi montane rat
Taeromys microbullatus - small-eared taeromys
Taeromys punicans - Sulawesi forest rat
Taeromys taerae - Tondano rat
Genus Tarsomys
Tarsomys apoensis - long-footed rat
Tarsomys echinatus - spiny long-footed rat
Genus Tateomys
Tateomys macrocercus - Long-tailed shrew rat
Tateomys rhinogradoides - Tate's shrew rat
Genus Thallomys
Thallomys loringi - Loring's rat
Thallomys nigricauda - Black-tailed tree rat
Thallomys paedulcus - Acacia rat
Thallomys shortridgei - Shortridge's rat
Genus Thamnomys
Thamnomys kempi - Kemp's thicket rat
Thamnomys major - Hatt's thicket rat
Thamnomys rutilans?
Thamnomys venustus - Charming thicket rat
Genus Tokudaia
Tokudaia muenninki - Muennink's spiny rat
Tokudaia osimensis - Ryukyu spiny rat
Tokudaia tokunoshimensis - Tokunoshima spiny rat
Genus Tonkinomys
Tonkinomys daovantieni - Daovantien's limestone rat
Genus Tryphomys
Tryphomys adustus - Luzon short-nosed rat
Genus Uromys
Uromys anak - Giant naked-tailed rat
Uromys boeadii - Biak giant rat
Uromys caudimaculatus - giant white-tailed rat
Uromys emmae - Emma's giant rat
Uromys hadrourus - Masked white-tailed rat
Uromys imperator - Emperor rat
Uromys neobritanicus - Bismarck giant rat
Uromys porculus - Guadalcanal rat
Uromys rex - King rat
Uromys siebersi - Great Key Island giant rat
Uromys vika - Vangunu giant rat
Genus Vandeleuria
Vandeleuria nilagirica - Nilgiri long-tailed tree mouse
Vandeleuria nolthenii - Nolthenius's long-tailed climbing mouse
Vandeleuria oleracea - Asiatic long-tailed climbing mouse
Genus Vernaya
Vernaya fulva - red climbing mouse
Vernaya prefulva
Vernaya pristina
Vernaya giganta
Vernaya wushanica
Genus Xenuromys
Xenuromys barbatus - Mimic tree rat
Genus Xeromys
Xeromys myoides - false water rat
Genus Zelotomys
Zelotomys hildegardeae - Hildegarde's broad-headed mouse
Zelotomys woosnami - Woosnam's broad-headed mouse
Genus Zyzomys
Zyzomys argurus - common rock rat
Zyzomys maini - Arnhem Land rock rat
Zyzomys palatilis - Carpentarian rock rat
Zyzomys pedunculatus - central rock rat
Zyzomys woodwardi - Kimberley rock rat

See also 
 Mammal classification

References 

Rodentia
Rodents
Rodents